

Deaths in September

 22: Bruce McPhee
 16: Myles Brand
 14: Darren Sutherland
 12: Jack Kramer

Current sporting seasons

American football 2009

NFL
NCAA Division I FBS

Auto racing 2009

Formula One
Sprint Cup
IRL IndyCar Series
World Rally Championship
Formula Two
Nationwide Series
Camping World Truck Series

WTTC
V8 Supercar
American Le Mans

Superleague Formula
Rolex Sports Car Series
FIA GT Championship
Formula Three
World Series by Renault
Deutsche Tourenwagen Masters
Super GT

Baseball 2009

Major League Baseball
Nippon Professional Baseball

Basketball 2009

WNBA (Playoffs)

Euroleague

Philippine collegiate:
NCAA
UAAP (Playoffs)

Canadian football 2009

Canadian Football League

Football (soccer) 2009

National teams competitions
2010 FIFA World Cup Qualifying
International clubs competitions
UEFA (Europe) Champions League
Europa League

AFC (Asia) Champions League
CAF (Africa) Champions League
CONCACAF (North & Central America) Champions League

Domestic (national) competitions
Argentina
Australia
Brazil
England
France
Germany

Italy
Japan
Norway
Russia
Scotland
Spain
Major League Soccer (USA & Canada)

Golf 2009

European Tour
PGA Tour
LPGA Tour
Champions Tour

Motorcycle racing 2009

Superbike World Championship
Supersport racing

Rugby league 2009

Super League
NRL

Rugby union 2009

English Premiership
Celtic League
Top 14

Currie Cup
Air New Zealand Cup

Days of the month

September 17, 2009 (Wednesday)

Baseball
Major League Baseball: (teams in bold clinch division title, teams in italics clinch wild card berth)
American League:
Detroit Tigers 7, Minnesota Twins 2
The Tigers lead by 3 games over the Twins in the race for the Central Division title with 4 games remaining.
National League:
Philadelphia Phillies 10, Houston Astros 3
Florida Marlins 5, Atlanta Braves 4
The Phillies clinch the East Division title for the 3rd straight season.
San Diego Padres 5, Los Angeles Dodgers 0
Colorado Rockies 10, Milwaukee Brewers 6
The Dodgers, already assured of a playoff berth, fail to clinch the West Division title, while the Rockies' win puts them 4 games ahead of the Braves for the wild card berth.

Cricket
ICC Champions Trophy in South Africa: (teams in bold advance to the semifinals)
Group A:
 205/6 (50 ov);  206/8 (50 ov) at Centurion. Australia win by 2 wickets.
 129 (36 ov);  130/3 (32.1 ov) at Johannesburg. India win by 7 wickets.
Final standings: Australia 5 points, Pakistan 4, India 3, West Indies 0.

Football (soccer)
U-20 World Cup in Egypt: (teams in bold advance to the round of 16)
Group E:
Australia  0–3 
 0–0 
Standings: Brazil, Czech Republic 4 points, Costa Rica 3, Australia 0.
Group F:
 4–0 
 1–0 
Standings: United Arab Emirates 4 points, Honduras, Hungary 3, South Africa 1.
UEFA Champions League group stage, Matchday 2:
Group A:
Bayern Munich  0–0  Juventus
Bordeaux  1–0  Maccabi Haifa
Standings: Bayern Munich, Bordeaux 4 points, Juventus 2, Maccabi Haifa 0.
Group B:
Manchester United  2–1  Wolfsburg
CSKA Moscow  2–1  Beşiktaş
Standings: Manchester United 6 points, Wolfsburg, CSKA Moscow 3, Beşiktaş 0.
Group C:
Milan  0–1  Zürich
Real Madrid  3–0  Marseille
Standings: Real Madrid 6 points, Zürich, Milan 3, Marseille 0.
Group D:
APOEL  0–1  Chelsea
Porto  2–0  Atlético Madrid
Standings: Chelsea 6 points, Porto 3, APOEL, Atlético Madrid 1.
Copa Sudamericana Round of 16, second leg: (first leg score in parentheses)
Vitória  1–1 (1–4)  River Plate. River Plate win 5–2 on aggregate.
Cienciano  0–2 (0–3)  San Lorenzo. San Lorenzo win 5–0 on aggregate.
Universidad de Chile  1–0 (1–1)  Internacional. Universidad de Chile win 2–1 on aggregate.
Emelec  2–1 (0–2)  Botafogo. Botafogo win 3–2 on aggregate.
AFC Champions League Quarter Finals, second leg: (first leg score in parentheses)
Pohang Steelers  4–1(ET) (1–3)  Bunyodkor. Pohang Steelers win 5–4 on aggregate.
Nagoya Grampus  3–1 (1–2)  Kawasaki Frontale. Nagoya Grampus win 4–3 on aggregate.
FC Seoul  1–1 (2–3)  Umm-Salal. Umm-Salal win 4–3 on aggregate.
Al-Ittihad  4–0 (1–1)  Pakhtakor Tashkent. Al-Ittihad win 5–1 on aggregate.
CONCACAF Champions League Group Stage, round 5: (teams in bold advance to the quarterfinals)
Group A:
Houston Dynamo  0–1  Pachuca
Standings: Pachuca 12 points, Árabe Unido 10, Houston Dynamo 7, Isidro Metapán 0.
Group B:
D.C. United  5–1  San Juan Jabloteh
Standings: Toluca 12 points (4 matches), D.C. United 9 (5), Marathón 6 (4), San Juan Jabloteh 0 (5).
Group D:
UNAM  2–1  W Connection
Real España  2–0  Comunicaciones
Standings: UNAM 13 points, Communicaciones, Real España 6,  W Connection 4.
Friendly international matches:
 2–0 
 1–2

Volleyball
European Women's Championship in Poland: (teams in bold advance to the semifinals)
Pool E in Łódź:
 3–1 
 1–3 
 0–3 
Standings: Netherlands 8 points, Russia, Poland 7, Bulgaria 6, Belgium, Spain 4.
Pool F in Katowice:
 0–3 
 2–3 
 1–3 
Standings: Italy 8 points, Germany 7, Serbia, Turkey 6, Czech Republic 5, Azerbaijan 4.
Asian Men's Championship in Manila, Philippines: (teams in bold advance to the second round)
Pool A:
 0–3 
Standings (2 matches): Kazakhstan 4 points, Myanmar, Chinese Taipei 3, Philippines 2.
Pool B:
 3–0 
Standings:  Japan (Heian period), Indonesia 4 points (2 matches), India 4 (3), Thailand 3 (3).
Pool C:
 3–0 
 0–3 
Standings: China 7 points (4 matches), Iran 6 (3), Sri Lanka, Vietnam 4 (3), Hong Kong 3 (3).
Pool D:
 3–1 
 0–3 
Standings: Australia 7 points (4 matches), South Korea 6 (3), Lebanon 5 (3), Qatar, Maldives 3 (3).
South American Women's Championship in Porto Alegre, Brazil:
Pool A:
 0–3 
 3–0 
Standings: Brazil, Argentina 2 points, Uruguay, Paraguay 1.
Pool B:
 1–3 
 3–0 
Standings: Peru, Colombia 2 points, Venezuela, Chile 1.
African Men's Championship in Tétouan, Morocco: (teams in bold advance to the semifinals)
Group A:
 0–3 
Standings: Cameroon 5 points (3 matches), Morocco 4 (2), Libya 3 (2), South Africa 3 (3).
Group B:
 3–0 
 3–1 
Standings: Egypt 8 points (4 matches), Algeria, Tunisia 5 (3), Botswana, Gabon 3 (3).

September 29, 2009 (Tuesday)

Baseball
Major League Baseball:
The Boston Red Sox clinch the American League wild card thanks to the Texas Rangers' 5–2 loss to the Los Angeles Angels of Anaheim, who will be the Red Sox opponents in the Division Series.

Basketball
WNBA Finals:
Game 1 at Phoenix: (W1) Phoenix Mercury 120, (E1) Indiana Fever 116 (OT). Mercury lead the best-of-5 series 1–0.
 The WNBA Finals go off to a flying start with the highest-scoring game in the league's history.
Euroleague:
First preliminary round, game 1:
Charleroi  55–53  Orléans
Ventspils   78–73  Benetton Treviso
Le Mans  61–60  ALBA Berlin
Aris Salonica  69–67  Maroussi

Cricket
ICC Champions Trophy in South Africa: (teams in bold advance to the semifinals)
Group B:
 146 (43.1 ov);  147/6 (27.1 ov) at Johannesburg. New Zealand win by 4 wickets.
Final standings: New Zealand, England 4 points, Sri Lanka, South Africa 2.

Football (soccer)
U-20 World Cup in Egypt: (teams in bold advance to the round of 16)
Group C:
 1–1 
United States  4–1 
Standings: Germany 4 points, USA, Cameroon 3, South Korea 1.
Group D:
 3–0 
 4–0 
Standings: Ghana, Uruguay 6 points, Uzbekistan, England 0.
UEFA Champions League group stage, Matchday 2:
Group E:
Fiorentina  2–0  Liverpool
Debrecen  0–4  Lyon
Standings: Lyon 6 points, Fiorentina, Liverpool 3, Debrecen 0.
Group F:
Rubin Kazan  1–1  Internazionale
Barcelona  2–0  Dynamo Kyiv
Standings: Barcelona 4 points, Dynamo Kyiv 3, Inter 2, Rubin Kazan 1.
Group G:
Unirea Urziceni  1–1  Stuttgart
Rangers  1–4  Sevilla
Standings: Sevilla 6 points, Stuttgart 2, Unirea Urziceni, Rangers 1.
Group H:
Arsenal  2–0  Olympiacos
AZ  1–1  Standard Liège
Standings: Arsenal 6 points, Olympiacos 3, Standard Liège, Arizona 1.
CONCACAF Champions League Group Stage, round 5: (teams in bold advance to the quarterfinals)
Group A:
Árabe Unido  6–0  Isidro Metapán
Standings: Árabe Unido 10 points (5 matches), Pachuca 9 (4), Houston Dynamo 7 (4), Isidro Metapán 0 (5).
Group C:
Columbus Crew  1–1  Saprissa
Cruz Azul  2–0  Puerto Rico Islanders
Standings: Cruz Azul 13 points, Columbus Crew 7, Saprissa 5, Puerto Rico Islanders 2.

Ice hockey
Victoria Cup in Zürich, Switzerland:
ZSC Lions 2–1 Chicago Blackhawks

Volleyball
European Women's Championship in Poland:
Pool E in Łódź:
 1–3 
 3–0 
 3–1 
Standings: Netherlands, Russia 6 points, Poland 5, Bulgaria 4, Belgium, Spain 3.
Pool F in Katowice:
 3–0 
 3–0 
 3–1 
Standings: Italy 6 points, Serbia, Germany 5, Turkey, Czech Republic 4, Azerbaijan 3.
Asian Men's Championship in Manila, Philippines: (teams in bold advance to the second round)
Pool A:
 3–0 
Pool B:
 0–3 
 also advance to the second round.
Pool C:
 2–3 
 3–0 
Pool D:
 3–1 
 3–0 
African Men's Championship in Tétouan, Morocco:
Group A:
 3–1 
Group B:
 3–0 
 3–0

September 28, 2009 (Monday)

American football
NFL Monday Night Football week 3:
Dallas Cowboys 21, Carolina Panthers 7
The Cowboys get their first win at their new stadium.

Baseball
Major League Baseball:
The Los Angeles Angels of Anaheim clinch the American League West division title with an 11–0 win over the Texas Rangers, who are 6 games behind the Boston Red Sox in the race for wild card berth.

Cricket
ICC Champions Trophy in South Africa: (teams in bold advance to the semifinals)
Group A:
 234/4 (42.3 ov) v  at Centurion. No result.
Standings: Pakistan 4 points, Australia 3, India 1, West Indies 0.

Football (soccer)
U-20 World Cup in Egypt: (teams in bold advance to the round of 16)
Group A:
 2–1 
 1–2 
Standings: Italy, Paraguay 4 points, Egypt 3, Trinidad and Tobago 0.
Group B:
 0–2 
 0–8 
Standings: Spain, Venezuela 6 points, Nigeria, Tahiti 0.

Volleyball
Asian Men's Championship in Manila, Philippines:
Pool A:
 3–2 
Pool B:
 3–0 
 3–1 
Pool C:
 3–1 
 0–3 
Pool D:
 2–3 
 0–3 
African Men's Championship in Tétouan, Morocco:
Group A:
 3–2 
Group B:
 0–3 
 3–1

September 27, 2009 (Sunday)

American football
NFL week 3 (teams at 3–0 in bold):
Detroit Lions 19, Washington Redskins 14
The Lions end their 19-game losing streak despite Jason Campbell passing for 327 yards and two touchdowns.
Green Bay Packers 36, St. Louis Rams 17
Minnesota Vikings 27, San Francisco 49ers 24
Brett Favre throws for 301 yards and two TDs, including the game-winner to Greg Lewis with 12 seconds left.
New England Patriots 26, Atlanta Falcons 10
New York Jets 24, Tennessee Titans 17
Philadelphia Eagles 34, Kansas City Chiefs 14
Kevin Kolb throws for 327 yards and two touchdowns to lead the Eagles, while Michael Vick makes his return to the NFL after 18 months in prison.
New York Giants 24, Tampa Bay Buccaneers 0
The Giants defense allows only 86 total yards.
Baltimore Ravens 34, Cleveland Browns 3
Joe Flacco throws for 342 yards and a touchdown while the Ravens defense allows only 186 yards.
Jacksonville Jaguars 31, Houston Texans 24
Maurice Jones-Drew runs for 119 yards and three TDs to lead the Jags, while Matt Schaub throws for 300 yards and three TDs in a losing effort.
New Orleans Saints 27, Buffalo Bills 7
Chicago Bears 25, Seattle Seahawks 19
San Diego Chargers 23, Miami Dolphins 13
Cincinnati Bengals 23, Pittsburgh Steelers 20
Carson Palmer brings the Bengals back from a 20–9 fourth quarter deficit with two TD passes, including the game-winner to Andre Caldwell with 14 seconds left.
Denver Broncos 23, Oakland Raiders 3
The Broncos defense allows only 137 total yards.
Sunday Night Football: Indianapolis Colts 31,  Arizona Cardinals 10
Peyton Manning's 379 yards and four TDs passing trumps Kurt Warner's 332 yards and one touchdown.

Auto racing
Formula One:
Singapore Grand Prix in Singapore:
(1) Lewis Hamilton  (McLaren–Mercedes) 1:56:06.337 (2) Timo Glock  (Toyota) +9.634 (3) Fernando Alonso  (Renault) +16.624
Drivers' standings (after 14 of 17 races): (1) Jenson Button  (Brawn-Mercedes) 84 points (2) Rubens Barrichello  (Brawn-Mercedes) 69 (3) Sebastian Vettel  (Red Bull-Renault) 59
Constructors' standings: (1) Brawn-Mercedes 153 (2) Red Bull-Renault 110.5 (3) Ferrari 62
Chase for the Sprint Cup:
AAA 400 in Dover, Delaware:
 (1) Jimmie Johnson  (Chevrolet, Hendrick Motorsports) (2) Mark Martin  (Chevrolet, Hendrick Motorsports) (3) Matt Kenseth  (Ford, Roush Fenway Racing)
Drivers' standings (with 8 races remaining): (1) Martin 5400 points (2) Johnson 5390 (3) Juan Pablo Montoya  (Chevrolet, Earnhardt Ganassi Racing) 5335

Badminton
BWF Super Series:
Japan Super Series in Tokyo: (seeding in parentheses)
Men's singles final: Bao Chunlai  bt Taufik Hidayat  (4) 21–15, 21–12
Women's singles final: Wang Yihan  (4) bt Wang Xin  21–8, 21–9
Men's doubles final: Markis Kido/Hendra Setiawan  (1) bt Yonathan Suryatama Dasuki/Rian Sukmawan  21–19, 24–22
Women's doubles final: Ma Jin/Wang Xiaoli  (5) bt Miyuki Maeda/Satoko Suetsuna  (7) 21–19, 21–18
Mixed doubles final: Songphon Anugritayawon/Kunchala Voravichitchaikul  bt Joachim Fischer Nielsen/Christinna Pedersen  (6) 13–21, 21–16, 22–20

Baseball
World Cup in Italy:
Final:   10–5  
United States win the title for the fourth time.
Major League Baseball:
The New York Yankees, already secured in the postseason, clinch the American League East division title and the League's best record with a 4–2 win over the Boston Red Sox.

Basketball
Americas Championship for Women in Cuiabá, Brazil:
Seventh place game:  87–82 (OT) 
Fifth place game:  61–49 
Third place game:  49–59 (OT)  
Canada outscore Cuba 11–1 in overtime and qualify for the 2010 World Championship.
Final:   71–48  
Brazil win the title for the 4th time.

Cricket
ICC Champions Trophy in South Africa: (teams in bold advance to the semifinals)
Group B:
 315/7 (50 ov);  277 (46.4 ov) at Johannesburg. New Zealand win by 38 runs.
 323/8 (50 ov);  301/9 (50 ov, Graeme Smith 141) at Centurion. England win by 22 runs.
Standings: England 4 points (2 matches), Sri Lanka 2 (3), New Zealand 2 (2), South Africa 2 (3).

Cycling
Road World Championships in Mendrisio, Switzerland:
Road race:
Men Elite, 262.2 km:   Cadel Evans  6h 56' 26"  Alexandr Kolobnev  + 27"  Joaquim Rodríguez  + 27"
Evans is the first Australian winner in the World Championships road race.

Football (soccer)
U-20 World Cup in Egypt:
Group E:
 5–0 
 2–1  Australia
Group F:
 2–2 
 3–0

Golf
PGA Tour:
FedEx Cup Playoffs:
The Tour Championship in Atlanta:
 Tournament winner: Phil Mickelson  271 (−9)
 FedEx Cup winner: Tiger Woods' second-place finish in Atlanta is enough to secure the season title.
European Tour:
Vivendi Trophy with Seve Ballesteros in Saint-Nom-la-Bretèche, France:
 &  16½–11½ 
 Team Great Britain & Ireland win for the fifth successive time, the last three by the same score.
LPGA Tour:
CVS/pharmacy LPGA Challenge in Blackhawk, California:
 Winner: Sophie Gustafson  269 (−19)

Motorcycle racing
Superbike:
Imola Superbike World Championship round in Imola, Italy:
Race 1: (1) Noriyuki Haga  (Ducati) 38:32.199 (2) Max Biaggi  (Aprilia) +2.074 (3) Michel Fabrizio  (Ducati) +2.190
Race 2: (1) Fabrizio 38:23.143 (2) Haga +3.592 (3) Marco Simoncelli  (Aprilia) +6.510
Riders' standings (after 12 of 14 rounds): (1) Haga 391 points (2) Ben Spies  (Yamaha) 388 (3) Fabrizio 330
Manufacturers' standings: (1) Ducati 489 points (2) Yamaha 431 (3) Honda 368

Squash
Women's World Open in Amsterdam, Netherlands:
Final: (1) Nicol David  bt (2) Natalie Grinham  3–11, 11–6, 11–3, 11–2
David wins the title for the fourth time, while Grinham is runner-up for the fourth time.

Tennis
ATP World Tour:
BCR Open Romania in Bucharest, Romania:
Final: Albert Montañés  (5) bt Juan Mónaco  (3) 7–6 (2), 7–6 (6)
Montañés wins his second title of the year and third of his career.
Open de Moselle in Metz, France:
Final: Gaël Monfils  (1) bt Philipp Kohlschreiber  (2) 7–6 (1), 3–6, 6–2
Monfils wins his second title and first in four years.
WTA Tour:
Hansol Korea Open in Seoul, South Korea:
Final: Kimiko Date  bt Anabel Medina Garrigues  (2) 6–3, 6–3
Date, who will celebrate her 39th birthday tomorrow, becomes the second-oldest player in the Open era to win a singles title on the WTA Tour, after Billie Jean King, who won the Edgbaston Cup at Birmingham in 1983 aged 39 and seven months. This is her first title since 1996 and the eighth of her career.
Tashkent Open in Tashkent, Uzbekistan:
Final: Shahar Pe'er  (2) bt Akgul Amanmuradova  6–3, 6–4
Pe'er wins her second tournament in two weeks and the fifth of her career.

Volleyball
NORCECA Women's Championship in Bayamón, Puerto Rico:
Seventh Place Match:  0–3 
Fifth Place Match:  0–3 
Bronze medal match:  2–3  
Final:   3–2  
The Dominican Republic win the title for the first time, and qualify for the World Grand Champions Cup.
European Women's Championship in Poland: (teams in bold advance to the second round)
Group A in Łódź:
 0–3 
 2–3 
Final standings: Netherlands 6 points, Poland 5, Spain 4, Croatia 3.
Group B in Wrocław:
 1–3 
 3–2 
Final standings: Italy 6 points, Germany 5, Turkey 4, France 3.
Group C in Bydgoszcz:
 1–3 
 3–2 
Final standings: Russia 6 points, Bulgaria 5, Belgium 4, Belarus 3.
Group D in Katowice:
 3–0 
 3–2 
Final standings: Serbia 6 points, Azerbaijan, Czech Republic, Slovakia 4.
Asian Men's Championship in Manila, Philippines:
Pool A:
 3–2 
Pool B:
 1–3 
Pool C:
 3–0 
 3–0 
Pool D:
 0–3 
 3–1 
African Men's Championship in Tétouan, Morocco:
Group A:
 3–0 
 2–3 
Group B:
 3–0 
 0–3

Wrestling
World Championships in Herning, Denmark:
Men's Greco-Roman:
66 kg:  Farid Mansurov   Manuchar Tskhadaia   Ambako Vakhadze  & Pedro Isaac 
74 kg:  Selçuk Çebi   Mark Madsen   Aliaksandr Kikiniou  & Farshad Alizadeh 
120 kg:  Mijaín López   Dremiel Byers   Jalmar Sjöberg  & Rıza Kayaalp

September 26, 2009 (Saturday)

American football
NCAA:
AP Top 10: (unbeaten teams in bold)
(1) Florida 41, Kentucky 7
The Gators' win is marred by a concussion to quarterback Tim Tebow.
(2) Texas 64, UTEP 7
(3) Alabama 35, Arkansas 7
Iowa 21, (5) Penn State 10
Oregon 42, (6) California 3
(7) LSU 30, Mississippi State 26
(8) Boise State 49, Bowling Green 14
(11) Virginia Tech 31, (9) Miami 7
Other games:
South Florida 17, (18) Florida State 7
Georgia Tech 24, (22) North Carolina 7
Stanford 34, (24) Washington 14
 (25) Nebraska 55, Louisiana–Lafayette 0
 The Cornhuskers celebrate their 300th straight home sellout with a blowout win.
Other remaining unbeaten teams (rankings in parentheses):
(14) Cincinnati, (15) TCU, (17) Houston, (20) Kansas, (23) Michigan, Auburn, Missouri, Texas A&M, Wisconsin

Australian rules football
AFL finals series:
Grand Final at the MCG, Melbourne:
St Kilda 9.14 (68)–12.8 (80) Geelong
The Cats rally from 7 points down and outscore their opponents 22–3 in the final quarter to win the title for the second time in 3 years and the eighth in their history.

Auto racing
Nationwide Series:
Dover 200 in Dover, Delaware:
 (1) Clint Bowyer  (Chevrolet, Richard Childress Racing) (2) Mike Bliss  (Toyota, CJM Racing) (3) Brad Keselowski  (Chevrolet, JR Motorsports)

Baseball
Major League Baseball:
 The Los Angeles Dodgers clinch a playoff berth with an 8–4 win over the Pittsburgh Pirates.
 The St. Louis Cardinals clinch the National League Central division title with a 6–3 win over the Colorado Rockies.
World Cup in Italy:
Bronze medal game:   6–2 
5th place game:  4–1 
7th place game:  6–3

Basketball
WNBA Playoffs:
Eastern Conference Finals:
Game 3 at Indianapolis: (1) Indiana Fever 72, (3) Detroit Shock 67. Fever win the best-of-3 series 2–1.
Western Conference Finals:
Game 3 at Phoenix: (1) Phoenix Mercury 85, (3) Los Angeles Sparks 74. Mercury win the best-of-3 series 2–1.
Americas Championship for Women in Cuiabá, Brazil:
Semifinals: (winners qualify for 2010 World Championship)
 79–59 
 63–53 
Classification 5–8:
 74–53 
 72–58

Cricket
ICC Champions Trophy in South Africa:
Group A:
 275/8 (50 ov);  225 (46.5 ov) at Johannesburg. Australia win by 50 runs.
 302/9 (50 ov, Shoaib Malik 128);  248 (44.5 ov) at Centurion. Pakistan win by 54 runs.
Standings: Pakistan 4 points (2 matches), Australia 2 (1), India 0 (1), West Indies 0 (2).

Cycling
Road World Championships in Mendrisio, Switzerland:
Road race:
Women, 124.2 km:   Tatiana Guderzo  3h 33' 25"  Marianne Vos  + 19"  Noemi Cantele  + 19"
Men U23, 179.4 km:   Romain Sicard  4h 41' 54"  Carlos Alberto Betancur  + 27"  Egor Silin  + 27"

Football (soccer)
U-20 World Cup in Egypt:
Group C:
United States  0–3 
 2–0 
Group D:
 2–1 
 0–1

Rugby league
NRL Finals Series:
Preliminary Final 2 in Melbourne:
Melbourne Storm  40–10  Brisbane Broncos
The Storm reach the Grand final for the fourth successive year.
Super League play-offs:
Preliminary Semi-Final 2:
Hull Kingston Rovers  10–30  Wigan Warriors
The Warriors advance to the Qualifying Semifinals to play either Leeds Rhinos or St. Helens.

Volleyball
NORCECA Women's Championship in Bayamón, Puerto Rico:
Classification 5/8:
 0–3 
 0–3 
Semifinals:
 3–2 
 2–3 
Both matches are decided 21–19 in the fifth set.
European Women's Championship in Poland: (teams in bold advance to the second round)
Group A in Łódź:
 3–0 
 0–3 
Standings: Netherlands, Poland 4 points, Spain, Croatia 2.
Group B in Wrocław:
 3–0 
 3–1 
Standings: Italy 4 points, Turkey, Germany 3, France 2.
Group C in Bydgoszcz:
 3–2 
 3–0 
Standings: Russia 4 points, Belgium, Bulgaria 3, Belarus 2.
Group D in Katowice:
 2–3 
 0–3 
Standings: Serbia 4 points, Slovakia, Azerbaijan 3, Czech Republic 2.

Wrestling
World Championships in Herning, Denmark:
Men's Greco-Roman:
60 kg:  Islambek Albiev   Dilshod Aripov   Nurbakyt Tengizbayev  & Vitaliy Rahimov 
84 kg:  Nazmi Avluca   Mélonin Noumonvi   Habibollah Akhlaghi  & Pablo Shorey 
96 kg:  Balázs Kiss   Jimmy Lidberg   Amir Ali-Akbari  & Aslanbek Khushtov

September 25, 2009 (Friday)

Basketball
WNBA Playoffs:
Eastern Conference Finals:
Game 2 at Indianapolis: (1) Indiana Fever 79, (3) Detroit Shock 75. Best-of-3 series tied 1–1.
Western Conference Finals:
Game 2 at Phoenix: (3) Los Angeles Sparks 87, (1) Phoenix Mercury 76. Best-of-3 series tied 1–1.
Americas Championship for Women in Cuiabá, Brazil: (teams in bold advance to the semifinals)
Group A:
 83–44 
 45–61 
Final standings: Brazil 6 points, Canada 5, Puerto Rico 4, Dominican Republic 3.
Group B:
 77–69 
 85–81 
Final standings: Argentina 6 points, Cuba 5, Chile 4, Venezuela 3.

Cricket
ICC Champions Trophy in South Africa:
Group B:
 212 (47.3 overs);  213/4 (45 overs) at Johannesburg. England win by 6 wickets.
Standings: England 2 points (1 match), Sri Lanka, South Africa 2 (2), New Zealand 0 (1).

Football (soccer)
U-20 World Cup in Egypt:
Group A:
 0–0 
Group B:
 0–1 
 8–0

Rugby league
NRL Finals Series:
Preliminary Final 1 in Sydney:
Bulldogs  12–22  Parramatta Eels
The Eels advance to the grand final for the first time since 2001 and will attempt to win the title after 23-years break.
Super League play-offs:
Preliminary Semi-Final 1:
Huddersfield Giants  6–16  Catalans Dragons
The Dragons advance to the Qualifying Semifinals to play either Leeds Rhinos or St. Helens.

Volleyball
NORCECA Women's Championship in Bayamón, Puerto Rico:
Quarterfinals:
 3–1 
 3–0 
European Women's Championship in Poland:
Group A in Łódź:
 3–0 
 2–3 
Group B in Wrocław:
 3–0 
 3–0 
Group C in Bydgoszcz:
 3–1 
 0–3 
Group D in Katowice:
 0–3 
 3–2

Wrestling
World Championships in Herning, Denmark:
Women:
67 kg:  Martine Dugrenier   Yulia Bartnovskaia   Ifeoma Iheanacho  & Badrakhyn Odonchimeg 
72 kg:  Qin Xiaoqing   Ochirbatyn Burmaa   Maider Unda  & Stanka Zlateva 
Men's Greco-Roman:
55 kg:  Hamid Sourian   Roman Amoyan   Håkan Nyblom  & Rovshan Bayramov

September 24, 2009 (Thursday)

American football
NCAA AP Top 10:
South Carolina 16, (4) Mississippi 10

Basketball
Asian Championship for Women in Chennai, India: (top three teams qualify for 2010 World Championship)
Final:   71–91  
Bronze medal game:   72–57 
Americas Championship for Women in Cuiabá, Brazil: (teams in bold advance to the semifinals)
Group A:
 70–57 
 121–62 
Standings: Brazil, Canada 4 points, Puerto Rico, Dominican Republic 2
Group B:
 62–57 
 95–55 
Standings: Cuba, Argentina 4 points, Chile, Venezuela 2.

Cricket
ICC Champions Trophy in South Africa:
Group B:
 214 (47.5 overs);  217/5 (41.1 overs) at Centurion. South Africa win by 5 wickets.

Cycling
Road World Championships in Mendrisio, Switzerland:
Individual time trials:
Men Elite, 49.8 km:   Fabian Cancellara  57' 55.74"  Gustav Larsson  + 1' 27.13"  Tony Martin  + 2' 30.18"

Football (soccer)
U-20 World Cup in Egypt:
Group A:
 4–1 
Copa Sudamericana Round of 16, first leg:
Cerro Porteño  2–0  Goiás
San Lorenzo  3–0  Cienciano
LDU Quito  4–0  Lanús
AFC Champions League Quarter Finals, first leg:
Pakhtakor Tashkent  1–1  Al-Ittihad
CONCACAF Champions League Group Stage, round 4:
Group B:
D.C. United  3–0  Marathón
Standings: Toluca 12 points, D.C. United, Marathón 6, San Juan Jabloteh 0.
Group D:
UNAM  4–0  Real España
Standings: UNAM 10 points, Comunicaciones 6, W Connection 4, Real España 3.

Snooker
Premier League Snooker – League phase in Southampton:
Neil Robertson  1–5 Stephen Hendry 
John Higgins  3–3 Marco Fu 
Standings: John Higgins 3 points; Ronnie O'Sullivan, Neil Robertson, Judd Trump, Stephen Hendry 2; Marco Fu 1; Shaun Murphy 0.

Volleyball
NORCECA Women's Championship in Bayamón, Puerto Rico: (teams in bold advance to the semifinals, teams in italics advance to the quarterfinals)
Group A:
 3–0 
 1–3 
Final standings: Dominican Republic 6 points, Puerto Rico 5, Canada 4, Trinidad&Tobago 3.
Group B:
 3–0 
 3–0 
Final standings: Cuba 6 points, USA 5, Mexico 4, Costa Rica 3.

Wrestling
World Championships in Herning, Denmark:
Women:
55 kg:  Saori Yoshida   Sona Ahmedli   Alena Filipava  & Tonya Verbeek 
59 kg:  Yuliya Ratkevich   Agata Pietrzyk   Marianna Sastin  & Ganna Vasylenko 
63 kg:  Mio Nishimaki   Lubov Volosova   Yelena Shalygina  & Justine Bouchard

September 23, 2009 (Wednesday)

Baseball
Major League Baseball:
Bobby Cox announces his retirement as manager of the Atlanta Braves at the end of the 2010 season. (AP via Google News)

Basketball
WNBA Playoffs:
Eastern Conference Finals:
Game 1 at Auburn Hills, Michigan: (3) Detroit Shock 72, (1) Indiana Fever 56. Shock lead best-of-3 series 1–0.
Western Conference Finals:
 Game 1 at Los Angeles: (1) Phoenix Mercury 103, (3) Los Angeles Sparks 94. Mercury lead best-of-3 series 1–0.
NBA news:
 Russian oligarch Mikhail Prokhorov announces a deal to purchase the New Jersey Nets and provide half of the funding for the team's planned new arena in Brooklyn. If approved by three-fourths of the league's other owners, he will become the first non-North American owner of an NBA team. (AP via ESPN)
Asian Championship for Women in Chennai, India:
Semifinals: (winners qualify for 2010 World Championship)
 101–57 
 70–59 
Americas Championship for Women in Cuiabá, Brazil:
Group A:
 37–103 
 34–78 
Group B:
 60–94 
 65–87

Cricket
ICC Champions Trophy in South Africa:
Group A:
 133 (34.3 ov);  134/5 (30.3 ov) at Johannesburg. Pakistan win by 5 wickets

Cycling
Road World Championships in Mendrisio, Switzerland:
Individual time trials:
Men Under 23, 33.2 km:   Jack Bobridge  40' 44.79"  Nelson Oliveira  + 18.73"  Patrick Gretsch  + 27.66"
Women, 26.8 km:   Kristin Armstrong  35' 26.09"  Noemi Cantele  + 55.01"  Linda Melanie Villumsen  + 58.25"
Armstrong, the reigning Olympic champion, wins the rainbow jersey for the second time.

Football (soccer)
Copa Sudamericana Round of 16, first leg:
Vélez Sarsfield  3–2  Unión Española
Alianza Atlético  2–2  Fluminense
Internacional  1–1  Universidad de Chile
Botafogo  2–0  Emelec
AFC Champions League Quarter Finals, first leg:
Kawasaki Frontale  2–1  Nagoya Grampus
Bunyodkor  3–1  Pohang Steelers
Umm-Salal  3–2  FC Seoul
CONCACAF Champions League Group Stage, round 4:
Group B:
Toluca  3–0  San Juan Jabloteh
Standings: Toluca 12 points (4 matches), Marathón 6 (3), D.C. United 3 (3), San Juan Jabloteh 0 (4).
Group C:
Columbus Crew  0–2  Cruz Azul
Standings: Cruz Azul 10 points, Columbus Crew 6, C.D. Saprissa 4, Puerto Rico Islanders 2.
Group D:
Comunicaciones  0–3  W Connection
Standings: UNAM 7 points (3 games), Comunicaciones 6 (4), W Connection 4 (4), Real España 3 (3).

Volleyball
NORCECA Women's Championship in Bayamón, Puerto Rico: (teams in italics secure at least quarterfinal berths)
Group A:
 3–0 
 0–3 
Standings: Dominican Republic, Puerto Rico 4 points, Canada, Trinidad&Tobago 2.
Group B:
 1–3 
 2–3 
Standings: Cuba 4 points, USA, Mexico 3, Costa Rica 2.

Wrestling
World Championships in Herning, Denmark:
Men's freestyle:
74 kg:  Denis Tsargush   Chamsulvara Chamsulvarayev   Ramesh Kumar  & Sadegh Goudarzi 
Women:
48 kg:  Mariya Stadnik   Larisa Oorzhak   So Sim-Hyang  & Lyudmyla Balushka 
51 kg:  Sofia Mattsson   Han Kum-Ok   Oleksandra Kohut  & Yuri Kai

September 22, 2009 (Tuesday)

Baseball
Major League Baseball:
New York Yankees 6, Los Angeles Angels 5
Oakland Athletics 9, Texas Rangers 1
The Yankees become the first team to clinch a playoff berth.

Cricket
ICC Champions Trophy in South Africa:
Group B:
 319/8 (50 ov, Tillakaratne Dilshan 106);  206/7 (37.4/37.4 ov) at Centurion. Sri Lanka win by 55 runs (D/L method)

Football (soccer)
Copa Sudamericana Round of 16, first leg:
River Plate  4–1  Vitória
CONCACAF Champions League Group Stage, round 4:
Group A:
Houston Dynamo  5–1  Árabe Unido
Isidro Metapán  0–4  Pachuca
Standings: Pachuca 9 points, Houston Dynamo, Árabe Unido 7, Isidro Metapán 0.
Group C:
Puerto Rico Islanders  1–1  Saprissa

Tennis
 Former world number 1 player Justine Henin announces that she is ending her year-long retirement from the sport. (AP via ESPN)

Volleyball
NORCECA Women's Championship in Bayamón, Puerto Rico:
Group A:
 0–3 
 3–0 
Group B:
 3–0 
 3–1

Wrestling
World Championships in Herning, Denmark:
Men's freestyle:
60 kg:  Besik Kudukhov   Zelimkhan Huseynov   Dilshod Mansurov  & Vasyl Fedoryshyn 
84 kg:  Zaurbek Sokhiev   Jacob Herbert   Ibragim Aldatov  & Sharif Sharifov 
120 kg:  Beylal Makhov   Fardin Masoumi   Ioannis Arzoumanidis  & Tervel Dlagnev

September 21, 2009 (Monday)

American football
NFL Monday Night Football week 2:
 Indianapolis Colts 27, Miami Dolphins 23
 The Colts go to 2–0, with Peyton Manning throwing for 303 yards and two touchdowns, including the game-winner to Pierre Garçon with 3:18 left.

Auto racing
The Fédération Internationale de l'Automobile gives a two-year suspended ban to the Renault F1 team for ordering Nelson Piquet Jr. to deliberately crash his vehicle during the 2008 Singapore Grand Prix. Renault F1 will pay for the investigation, and has sacked team principal Flavio Briatore, who has been banned from the sport by FIA.

Basketball
WNBA Playoffs:
Western Conference First Round:
Game 3: (1) Phoenix Mercury 100, (4) San Antonio Silver Stars 92 in Phoenix. Mercury win best-of-3 series 2–1.

Wrestling
World Championships in Herning, Denmark:
Men's freestyle:
55 kg:  Yang Kyong-Il   Sezar Akgül   Rizvan Gadzhiev  & Viktor Lebedev 
66 kg:  Mehdi Taghavi   Rasul Djukayev   Tatsuhiro Yonemitsu  & Leonid Spiridonov 
96 kg:  Khadjimourat Gatsalov   Khetag Gazyumov   Serhat Balcı  & Georgi Gogshelidze

September 20, 2009 (Sunday)

American football
NFL week 2: (teams in bold have 2–0 record)
Atlanta Falcons 28, Carolina Panthers 20
Matt Ryan's three passing touchdowns trump Jake Delhomme's 308 yards through the air.
Minnesota Vikings 27, Detroit Lions 13
Brett Favre makes his 271st consecutive regular-season start, breaking the previous record of former Vikings great Jim Marshall.
Cincinnati Bengals 31, Green Bay Packers 24
Houston Texans 34, Tennessee Titans 31
Matt Schaub leads the Texans with 357 yards passing for four touchdowns.
Oakland Raiders 13, Kansas City Chiefs 10
New York Jets 16, New England Patriots 9
New Orleans Saints 48, Philadelphia Eagles 22
Drew Brees throws for 311 yards and three TDs to lead the Saints. Kevin Kolb, starting for the injured Donovan McNabb, throws for 391 yards in a losing effort.
Washington Redskins 9, St. Louis Rams 7
Arizona Cardinals 31, Jacksonville Jaguars 17
The Cardinals' Kurt Warner sets a new NFL record for completion percentage in a game, going 24-for-26.
Buffalo Bills 33, Tampa Bay Buccaneers 20
Chicago Bears 17, Pittsburgh Steelers 14
Denver Broncos 27, Cleveland Browns 6
Baltimore Ravens 31, San Diego Chargers 26
San Francisco 49ers 23, Seattle Seahawks 10
Sunday Night Football: New York Giants 33, Dallas Cowboys 31
 The Giants spoil the Cowboys' regular-season debut at their new stadium, with Lawrence Tynes kicking a 37-yard field goal as time expires.

Athletics
Berlin Marathon:
Men: (1) Haile Gebrselassie  2hr 6min 8sec (2) Francis Kiprop  2:07:04 (3) Negari Terfa  2:07:41
Gebrselassie wins the race for the fourth straight year.
Women: (1) Atsede Habtamu Besuye  2:24:47 (2) Silvia Skvortsova  2:26:24 (3) Mamitu Daska  2:26:38

Auto racing
Chase for the Sprint Cup:
Sylvania 300 in Loudon, New Hampshire:
 (1) Mark Martin  (Chevrolet, Hendrick Motorsports) (2) Denny Hamlin  (Toyota, Joe Gibbs Racing) (3) Juan Pablo Montoya  (Chevrolet, Earnhardt Ganassi Racing)
Drivers' standings (with 9 races remaining): (1) Martin 5230 points (2) Jimmie Johnson  5195 (Chevrolet, Hendrick Motorsports) (3) Hamlin 5195

Badminton
BWF Super Series:
China Masters Super Series in Changzhou: (seeding in parentheses)
Men's Singles: Lin Dan  (4) bt Boonsak Ponsana  (7) 21–17, 21–17
Women's Singles: Wang Shixian  bt Wang Lin  (2) 21–14, 14–21, 21–14
Men's Doubles: Guo Zhendong/Xu Chen  (7) bt Cai Yun/Fu Haifeng  (2) walkover
Women's Doubles: Du Jing/Yu Yang  (3) bt Cheng Shu/Zhao Yunlei  (1) 21–15, 21–15
Mixed Doubles: Tao Jiaming/Wang Xiaoli  bt Xie Zhongbo/Zhang Yawen  (3) 13–21, 21–19, 8–4 (ret)

Basketball
EuroBasket in Katowice, Poland: (the top six teams plus the host Turkey qualify for 2010 World Championship)
5th place game:  69–62 
7th place game:  66–89 
Bronze medal game:   57–56 
Final:   85–63  
Spain win their first ever European title after losing in six previous finals.
WNBA Playoffs:
Western Conference First Round:
Game 3: (3) Los Angeles Sparks 75, (2) Seattle Storm 64 in Seattle. Sparks win best-of-3 series 2–1.

Cricket
Australia in England:
7th ODI in Chester-le-Street:
 176 (45.5 ov, Graeme Swann 5/28);  177/6 (40 ov). England win by 4 wickets. Australia win the 7-match series 6–1.

Cycling
Vuelta a España:
Stage 21 – Rivas-Vaciamadrid to Madrid, 110 km: (1) André Greipel  3h 11' 55" (2) Daniele Bennati  s.t. (3) Borut Božič  s.t.
Greipel wins his fourth stage and the points classification.
Final general classification: (1)  Alejandro Valverde  87h 22' 37" (2) Samuel Sánchez  + 55" (3) Cadel Evans  + 1' 32"

Football (soccer)
CAF Champions League group stage, round 6: (teams in bold advance to the semifinals)
Group B:
Monomotapa United  2–1  Heartland
TP Mazembe  1–0  Étoile du Sahel
Final standings: TP Mazembe 12 points, Heartland 10, Étoile du Sahel 7, Monomotapa United 6.
Semifinal matchups: TP Mazembe vs Al-Hilal, Kano Pillars vs Heartland

Gaelic football
All-Ireland SFC Final in Dublin:
Cork  1-09 (12) – 0–16 (16) Kerry (RTÉ) (The Irish Times)
Kerry win their 36th All-Ireland SFC title. Tadhg Kennelly becomes the first player to collect winner's medals in both the Senior Football Championship and the Australian Football League, having previously won the AFL premiership with Sydney Swans in 2005.

Golf
European Tour:
Bank Austria GolfOpen in Oberwaltersdorf, Austria:
 Winner: Rafael Cabrera-Bello  264 (−20)
 Cabrera-Bello ties a European Tour record with a final-round 60 and edges out Benn Barham  by one shot.
LPGA Tour:
Samsung World Championship in La Jolla, California:
 Winner: Na Yeon Choi  272 (−16)
 Choi wins her first LPGA Tour title by one shot over Ai Miyazato .

Professional wrestling
Total Nonstop Action Wrestling (TNA) held their fifth annual No Surrender pay-per-view event.
Sarita and Taylor Wilde defeated The Beautiful People (Madison Rayne and Velvet Sky) to become the first TNA Knockout Tag Team Champions
ODB defeated Cody Deaner to win the vacant TNA Women's Knockout Championship
A.J. Styles defeated the previous champion, Kurt Angle, Sting, Matt Morgan, and Hernandez to win the TNA World Heavyweight Championship.

Rugby league
Super League playoffs:
Elimination Play Off 2 in Wigan
Wigan Warriors  18–12  Castleford Tigers
Wigan will play at Hull Kingston Rovers in the Preliminary Semifinal; Castleford is eliminated.

Table tennis
European Championships in Stuttgart, Germany:
Men's singles: Michael Maze  bt Werner Schlager  4–1
Men's doubles: Timo Boll/Christian Süß  bt Wang Zeng Yi/Lucjan Blasczyk  4–2
Women's singles: Wu Jiaduo  bt Margaryta Pesotska  4–0
Women's doubles: Elizabeta Samara/Daniela Dodean  bt Nikoleta Stefanova/Tan Wenling  4–0

Tennis
Davis Cup:
World Group Semifinals, day 3:
 1–4  in Poreč
Jan Hájek  bt Roko Karanušić  7–6(4), 6–4
Lovro Zovko  bt Lukáš Dlouhý  6–3, 6–4
 4–1  in Murcia
David Ferrer  bt Andy Ram  6–3, 6–1
Harel Levy  bt Feliciano López  7–5, 6–2
World Group Play-offs, day 3: (winners will play in 2010 Davis Cup World Group, losers will play in Zonal groups)
 3–2  in Rancagua
Jürgen Melzer  bt Paul Capdeville  7–6(2), 4–6, 6–2, 5–7, 6–4
Nicolás Massú  bt Stefan Koubek  6–4, 4–6, 6–4, 7–6(6)
Chile retain their place in the World Group, while Austria are relegated to Zonal Group 1 after six years in the top division.
 3–2  in Charleroi
Sergiy Stakhovsky  bt Xavier Malisse  6–3, 3–6, 0–6, 6–1, 6–3
Steve Darcis  bt Sergei Bubka  6–2, 6–1, 6–0
Belgium advance back to the World Group after one-year absence, and deny Ukraine their first ever opportunity to reach the top level.
 2–3  in Porto Alegre
Nicolás Lapentti  bt Marcos Daniel  6–4, 6–4, 1–6, 2–6, 8–6
Thomaz Bellucci  bt Júlio César Campozano  6–2, 6–4
Ecuador win sixth successive tie and reach the World Group for the first time since 2001, while Brazil lose in the play-offs for the fourth straight year.
 1–4  in Maastricht
Jo-Wilfried Tsonga  bt Thiemo de Bakker  7–6(5), 6–2, 3–6, 7–6(4)
Jérémy Chardy  bt Jesse Huta Galung  6–3, 6–2
France remain in the World Group for the 12th straight year, while Netherlands are relegated to Zonal Group 1 after one year in the top flight.
 1–4  in Johannesburg
Somdev Devvarman  bt Rik de Voest  3–6, 6–7(3), 7–6(5), 6–2, 6–4
Yuki Bhambri  bt Izak van der Merwe  3–6, 6–3, 6–4
India advance to the World Group for the first time since 1998, and deny South Africa, that won 10 consecutive ties before this one, from doing exactly the same.
 5–0  in Belgrade
Viktor Troicki  bt Murad Inoyatov  4–6, 6–4, 6–3
Ilija Bozoljac  bt Vaja Uzakov  6–1, 6–4
Serbia stay in the World Group for the third straight year, while Uzbekistan fail to advance to the top level for the first time.
 3–2  in Helsingborg
Robin Söderling  bt Victor Hănescu  7–5, 6–1, 6–0
Marius Copil  bt Andreas Vinciguerra  4–6 retired
Sweden retain their World Group status for the tenth successive year, while Romania are relegated to Zonal Group 1 for the first time since 2002.
 2–3  in Genoa
Roger Federer  bt Potito Starace  6–3, 6–0, 6–4
Federer extends his winning streak in Davis Cup singles matches to 12, and keeps Switzerland in the World Group; Italy's absence from the World Group is extended to 10 years.
Fabio Fognini  bt Michael Lammer  7–5, 7–6(4)
WTA Tour:
Guangzhou International Women's Open in Guangzhou, China:
Final: Shahar Pe'er  (5) bt Alberta Brianti  (8) 6–3, 6–4
Pe'er wins her first title in three years and her fourth WTA Tour title overall. Brianti reach her first WTA Tour final.
Bell Challenge in Quebec City, Canada:
Final: Melinda Czink  (5) vs. Lucie Šafářová  (4) 4–6, 6–3, 7–5
Czink wins her first WTA Tour title.

September 19, 2009 (Saturday)

American football
NCAA
AP Top 10:
(1) Florida 23, Tennessee 13
(2) Texas 34, Texas Tech 24
Washington 16, (3) USC 13
 The Huskies, winless last season, stun the Trojans in Seattle, with Erik Folk kicking a winning 22-yard field goal with 3 seconds left.
(4) Alabama 53, North Texas 7
(5) Mississippi 52, Southeastern Louisiana 6
(5) Penn State 31, Temple 6
Florida State 54, (7) Brigham Young 28
(8) California 35, Minnesota 21
Jahvid Best runs for 131 yards and all five of the Bears' touchdowns.
(9) LSU 31, Louisiana–Lafayette 3
Other games:
 (13) Virginia Tech 16, (19) Nebraska 15
 Tyrod Taylor's 11-yard TD pass to Dyrell Roberts with 21 seconds left gives the Hokies the home win.
Oregon 31, (18) Utah 24

Australian rules football
AFL finals series:
Preliminary Final 2 at the MCG, Melbourne:
Geelong 17.18 (120)–6.11 (47) Collingwood
Geelong, after outscoring their opponents 71–9 in the second half, will play against St Kilda in the Grand Final on September 26.

Auto racing
IndyCar Series:
Indy Japan 300 in Motegi, Japan:
(1) Scott Dixon  (Chip Ganassi Racing) (2) Dario Franchitti  (Chip Ganassi Racing) (3) Graham Rahal  (Newman/Haas/Lanigan Racing)
Drivers' standings (after 16 of 17 races): (1) Dixon 570 points (2) Franchitti 565 (3) Ryan Briscoe  (Penske Racing) 562

Basketball
EuroBasket in Katowice, Poland:
Classification 5–8: (winners qualify for 2010 World Championship)
 80–68 
 69–76 
Semifinals:
 82–64 
Spain advance to the final for the seventh time.
 96–92 (OT) 
Serbia advance to the final for the fourth time, the first since 2001.
WNBA Playoffs:
Eastern Conference First Round:
Game 2: (1) Indiana Fever 81, (4) Washington Mystics 74 (OT) in Indianapolis. Fever win best-of-3 series 2–0.
Western Conference First Round:
Game 2: (1) Phoenix Mercury 106, (4) San Antonio Silver Stars 78 in Phoenix. Best-of-3 series tied 1–1.

Boxing
Floyd Mayweather Jr. vs. Juan Manuel Márquez card at Las Vegas:
Floyd Mayweather Jr.  def. Juan Manuel Márquez  via unanimous decision.
Mayweather comes back from a 21-month retirement to extend his unbeaten record to 40–0 and retain the WBC and The Ring welterweight titles.
Chris John  def. Rocky Juarez  via unanimous decision to retain the WBA featherweight title.
Michael Katsidis  def. Vicente Escobedo  via split decision in a lightweight bout.
Cornelius Lock   knocked out Orlando Cruz  in the fifth round in a featherweight bout.
Erislandy Lara  knocked out Jose Varela  in the first round in a junior middleweight bout.

Cycling
Vuelta a España:
Stage 20 – Toledo, 26 km (ITT): (1) David Millar  35' 53" (2) Samuel Sánchez  + 5" (3) Cadel Evans  + 9"
General classification: (1)  Alejandro Valverde  84h 10' 32" (2) Sánchez + 55" (3) Evans + 1' 32"

Football (soccer)
CAF Champions League group stage, round 6: (teams in bold advance to the semifinals)
Group A:
ZESCO United  2–0  Al-Hilal
Al-Merreikh  1–1  Kano Pillars
Final standings: Kano Pillars 11 points, Al-Hilal 10, ZESCO United 8, Al-Merreikh 3.

Rugby league
NRL Finals Series:
Semifinal in Brisbane: (winner advances to Preliminary Final, loser eliminated)
Brisbane Broncos  24–10  St George Illawarra Dragons
Super League playoffs:
Qualifying Play Off 2 in St. Helens:
St. Helens  15–2  Huddersfield Giants
The Saints advance to the Qualifying Semi-Finals.
Elimination Play Off 1 in Wakefield:
Wakefield Trinity Wildcats  16–25  Catalans Dragons
The Dragons will play against Huddersfield in the Preliminary Semi-Finals; the Wildcats are eliminated.

Rugby union
Tri Nations Series:
 33–6  in Wellington
 Final standings:  21 points, New Zealand 13, Australia 7.

Tennis
Davis Cup:
World Group Semifinals, day 2:
 0–3  in Poreč
Tomáš Berdych/Radek Štěpánek  Roko Karanušić/Lovro Zovko  6–1, 6–3, 6–4
The Czech Republic advance to the final for the third time overall and the first as a separate state, with their previous final appearance being in 1980 as Czechoslovakia.
 3–0  in Murcia
Feliciano López/Tommy Robredo  bt Jonathan Erlich/Andy Ram  7–6(6), 6–7(7), 6–4, 6–2
Defending champions Spain reach the final for the second straight year and the seventh time in their history, five of them are in the last decade. Spain's win over Israel is their 17th straight home victory.
World Group Play-offs, day 2: (winners will play in 2010 Davis Cup World Group, losers will play in Zonal groups)
 2–1  in Rancagua
Julian Knowle/Jürgen Melzer  bt Paul Capdeville/Nicolás Massú  6–2, 6–4, 6–3
 2–1  in Charleroi
Sergei Bubka/Sergiy Stakhovsky  bt Olivier Rochus/Xavier Malisse  7–6 (5), 3–6, 6–4, 7–6 (7)
 1–2  in Porto Alegre
Giovanni Lapentti/Nicolás Lapentti  bt Marcelo Melo/André Sá  3–6, 6–3, 6–4, 4–6, 6–4
 1–2  in Maastricht
Jo-Wilfried Tsonga/Michaël Llodra  bt Thiemo de Bakker/Igor Sijsling  6–3, 3–6, 7–6 (2), 6–4
 1–2  in Johannesburg
Jeff Coetzee/Wesley Moodie  bt Mahesh Bhupathi/Rohan Bopanna  6–3, 3–6, 4–0 – Retired
 3–0  in Belgrade
Janko Tipsarević/Nenad Zimonjić  bt Farrukh Dustov/Denis Istomin  6–2, 6–3, 6–2
 2–1  in Helsingborg
Robert Lindstedt/Robin Söderling  bt Victor Hănescu/Horia Tecău  6–1, 7–6 (7), 7–6 (5)
 1–2  in Genoa
Simone Bolelli/Potito Starace  bt Marco Chiudinelli/Stanislas Wawrinka  6–2, 6–4, 7–6(3)

September 18, 2009 (Friday)

American football
NCAA AP Top 10:
 Milk Can: (10) Boise State 51, Fresno State 34

Australian rules football
AFL finals series:
Preliminary Final 1 at the MCG, Melbourne:
St Kilda 9.6 (60)–7.11 (53) Western Bulldogs

Basketball
EuroBasket in Katowice, Poland: (winners qualify for 2010 World Championship)
Quarterfinals:
 74–76 (OT) 
 67–65 
Slovenia advance to the semifinals for the first time.
WNBA Playoffs:
Eastern Conference First Round:
Game 2: (3) Detroit Shock 94, (2) Atlanta Dream 79 in Duluth, Georgia. Shock win best-of-3 series 2–0
Western Conference First Round:
Game 2: (2) Seattle Storm 75, (3) Los Angeles Sparks 74 in Seattle. Best-of-3 series tied 1–1.

Cycling
Vuelta a España:
Stage 19 – Ávila to La Granja de San Ildefonso, 175 km: (1) Juan José Cobo  4h 37' 35" (2) Alejandro Valverde  + 2" (3) Cadel Evans  s.t.
General classification: (1)  Valverde 83h 34' 03" (2) Samuel Sánchez  + 1' 26" (3) Ivan Basso  + 1' 45"

Rugby league

NRL Finals Series:
Semifinal in Sydney: (winner advances to Preliminary Final, loser eliminated)
Parramatta Eels  27–2  Gold Coast Titans
Super League playoffs:
Qualifying Play Off 1 in Leeds:
Leeds Rhinos  44–8  Hull Kingston Rovers
The Rhinos, two-time defending champions and this season's league leaders, will now receive their choice of opponent in the Qualifying Semi-Finals in two weeks' time.

Tennis
Davis Cup:
World Group Semifinals, day 1:
 0–2  in Poreč
Radek Štěpánek  bt Ivo Karlović  6–7 (5), 7–6 (5), 7–6 (5), 6–7 (2), 16–14
Štěpánek saves 5 match points and overcomes a world record of 78 aces by Karlović, to win after 82 games – equalling the Davis cup record since the introduction of the tie-break, and 5 hours 59 minutes – the fourth longest match in Davis Cup history.
Tomáš Berdych  bt Marin Čilić  6–3, 6–3, 3–6, 4–6, 6–3
 2–0  in Murcia
David Ferrer  bt Harel Levy  6–1, 6–4, 6–3
Juan Carlos Ferrero  bt Dudi Sela  6–4, 6–2, 6–0
World Group Play-offs, day 1:
 2–0  in Rancagua
Nicolás Massú  bt Jürgen Melzer  4–6, 6–4, 6–4, 6–3
Paul Capdeville  bt Stefan Koubek  6–4, 6–4, 3–6, 1–6, 6–4
 2–0  in Charleroi
Christophe Rochus  bt Illya Marchenko  6–3, 6–4, 3–6, 6–2
Steve Darcis  bt Sergiy Stakhovsky  6–2, 6–3, 6–4
 1–1  in Porto Alegre
Marcos Daniel  bt Giovanni Lapentti  7–6 (3), 3–6, 7–6 (4), 6–2
Nicolás Lapentti  bt Thomaz Bellucci  7–6 (2), 6–4, 7–5
 1–1  in Maastricht
Thiemo de Bakker  bt Gaël Monfils  6–3, 5–7, 6–3, 6–4
Jo-Wilfried Tsonga  bt Jesse Huta Galung  7–6 (2), 6–2, 7–6 (3)
 0–2  in Johannesburg
Somdev Devvarman  bt Izak van der Merwe  7–6 (5), 6–3, 6–4
Rohan Bopanna  bt Rik de Voest  2–6, 6–4, 6–2, 6–4
 2–0  in Belgrade
Janko Tipsarević  bt Denis Istomin  6–2, 5–7, 6–1, 6–4
Viktor Troicki  bt Farrukh Dustov  6–4, 3–6, 6–3, 4–6, 6–2
 1–1  in Helsingborg
Victor Hănescu  bt Andreas Vinciguerra  7–6 (5), 7–6 (10) – retired
Robin Söderling  bt Victor Crivoi  6–2, 6–1, 7–5
 0–2  in Genoa
Stanislas Wawrinka  bt Andreas Seppi  6–4, 6–1, 6–2
Roger Federer  bt Simone Bolelli  6–3, 6–4, 6–1

September 17, 2009 (Thursday)

American football
NCAA AP Top 25:
(20) Miami 33, (14) Georgia Tech 17

Basketball
EuroBasket in Katowice, Poland: (winners qualify for 2010 World Championship)
Quarterfinals:
 68–79 
 66–86 
WNBA Playoffs:
Eastern Conference First Round:
Game 1: (1) Indiana Fever 88, (4) Washington Mystics 79 in College Park, Maryland. Fever lead best-of-3 series 1–0.
Western Conference First Round:
Game 1: (4) San Antonio Silver Stars 92, (1) Phoenix Mercury 91 in San Antonio. Silver Stars lead best-of-3 series 1–0.

Cricket
Australia in England:
6th ODI in Nottingham:
 296/8 (50 ov, Tim Paine 111);  185 (41.0 ov). Australia win by 111 runs. Australia lead the 7-match series 6–0.

Cycling
Vuelta a España:
Stage 18 – Talavera de la Reina to Ávila, 175 km: (1) Philip Deignan  4h 19' 14" (2) Roman Kreuziger  + 3" (3) Jakob Fuglsang  + 16"
General classification: (1)  Alejandro Valverde  78h 56' 42" (2) Robert Gesink  + 32' (3) Samuel Sánchez  + 1' 10"

Football (soccer)
UEFA Europa League group stage, Matchday 1:
Group A:
Ajax  0–0  Timişoara
Dinamo Zagreb  0–2  Anderlecht
Group B:
Lille  1–1  Valencia
Genoa  2–0  Slavia Prague
Group C:
Hapoel Tel Aviv  2–1  Celtic
Rapid Wien  3–0  Hamburg
Group D:
Hertha BSC  1–1  Ventspils
Heerenveen  2–3  Sporting CP
Group E:
CSKA Sofia  1–1  Fulham
Basel  2–0  Roma
Group F:
Panathinaikos  1–3  Galatasaray
Sturm Graz  0–1  Dinamo București
Group G:
Lazio  1–2  Red Bull Salzburg
Villarreal  1–0  Levski Sofia
Group H:
Steaua București  0–0  Sheriff Tiraspol
Fenerbahçe  1–2  Twente
Group I:
Benfica  2–0  BATE Borisov
Everton  4–0  AEK Athens
Group J:
Club Brugge  1–4  Shakhtar Donetsk
Partizan  2–3  Toulouse
Group K:
Sparta Prague  2–2  PSV Eindhoven
CFR Cluj  2–0  Copenhagen
Group L:
Athletic Bilbao  3–0  Austria Wien
Nacional  2–3  Werder Bremen
Copa Sudamericana First Stage, second leg: (first leg score in parentheses)
Lanús  1–0 (2–1)  River Plate. Lanús win 3–1 on aggregate.
CONCACAF Champions League Group Stage, round 3:
Group B:
Toluca  7–0  Marathón
Standings: Toluca 9 points, Marathón 6, D.C. United 3, San Juan Jabloteh 0.
Group D:
Comunicaciones  2–0  Real España
Standings: UNAM 7 points, Comunicaciones 6, Real España 3, W Connection 1.

Snooker
Premier League Snooker – League phase in Great Malvern:
Shaun Murphy  2–4 John Higgins 
Stephen Hendry  2–4 Judd Trump 
Standings: Ronnie O'Sullivan, Neil Robertson, Judd Trump, John Higgins 2 points; Stephen Hendry, Marco Fu, Shaun Murphy 0.

September 16, 2009 (Wednesday)

Basketball
EuroBasket in Poland: (teams in bold advance to the quarterfinals)
Group F in Łódź:
 79–89 
 68–90 
 67–69 
Final standings: Slovenia, Turkey 9 points, Serbia, Spain 8, Poland 6, Lithuania 5.
WNBA Playoffs:
Eastern Conference First Round:
Game 1: (3) Detroit Shock 94, (2) Atlanta Dream 89 in Auburn Hills, Michigan. Shock lead best-of-3 series 1–0.
Western Conference First Round:
Game 1: (3) Los Angeles Sparks 70, (2) Seattle Storm 63 in Los Angeles. Sparks lead best-of-3 series 1–0.

Cycling
Vuelta a España:
Stage 17 – Ciudad Real to Talavera de la Reina, 175 km: (1) Anthony Roux  4h 28' 14" (2) William Bonnet  + 0" (3) André Greipel  + 0"
General classification: (1)  Alejandro Valverde  74h 27' 48" (2) Robert Gesink  + 31' (3) Samuel Sánchez  + 1' 10"

Football (soccer)
UEFA Champions League group stage, Matchday 1:
Group E:
Liverpool  1–0  Debrecen
Lyon  1–0  Fiorentina
Group F:
Internazionale  0–0  Barcelona
Dynamo Kyiv  3–1  Rubin Kazan
Group G:
Stuttgart  1–1  Rangers
Sevilla  2–0  Unirea Urziceni
Group H:
Olympiacos  1–0  AZ
Standard Liège  2–3  Arsenal
Copa Sudamericana First Stage, second leg: (first leg score in parentheses)
Goiás  1–1 (1–1)  Atlético Mineiro. 2–2 on aggregate, Goiás win 6–5 on penalty shootout.
Botafogo  3–2 (0–0)  Atlético Paranaense. Botafogo win 3–2 on aggregate.
Vélez Sársfield  1–0 (1–1)  Boca Juniors. Vélez Sársfield win 2–1 on aggregate.
CONCACAF Champions League Group Stage, round 3:
Group A:
Pachuca  2–0  Houston Dynamo
Standings: Árabe Unido 7 points, Pachuca 6, Houston Dynamo 4, Isidro Metapán 0.
Group C:
Saprissa  0–1  Columbus Crew
Standings: Cruz Azul 7 points, Columbus Crew 6, Saprissa 3, Puerto Rico Islanders 1.
Group D:
W Connection  2–2  UNAM
Standings: UNAM 7 points, Comunicaciones, Real España 3 (2 matches), W Connection 1.

September 15, 2009 (Tuesday)

Basketball
EuroBasket in Poland: (teams in bold advance to the quarterfinals)
Group E in Bydgoszcz:
 71–69 
 71–69 
 68–70 
Final standings: France 10 points, Russia, Greece 8, Croatia 7, Germany, Macedonia 6.

Cricket
Australia in England:
5th ODI in Nottingham:
 299 (50 ov);  302/6 (48.2 ov, Ricky Ponting 126). Australia win by 4 wickets. Australia lead the 7-match series 5–0.

Cycling
Vuelta a España:
Stage 16 – Córdoba to Puertollano, 170 km: (1) André Greipel  4h 50' 44" (2) William Bonnet  + 0" (3) Daniele Bennati  + 0"
Greipel wins his third stage of this Vuelta and takes the lead in the points classification.
General classification: (1)  Alejandro Valverde  69h 59' 34" (2) Robert Gesink  + 31' (3) Samuel Sánchez  + 1' 10"

Football (soccer)
UEFA Champions League group stage, Matchday 1:
Group A:
Juventus  1–1  Bordeaux
Maccabi Haifa  0–3  Bayern Munich
Group B:
Wolfsburg  3–1  CSKA Moscow
Beşiktaş  0–1  Manchester United
Group C:
Zürich  2–5  Real Madrid
Marseille  1–2  Milan
Group D:
Chelsea  1–0  Porto
Atlético Madrid  0–0  APOEL
Copa Sudamericana First Stage, second leg: (first leg score in parentheses)
San Lorenzo  1–0 (1–2)  Tigre. 2–2 on aggregate, San Lorenzo win on away goals rule.
Deportivo Anzoátegui  1–2 (0–0)  Alianza Atlético. Alianza Atlético win 2–1 on aggregate.
CONCACAF Champions League Group Stage, round 3:
Group A:
Isidro Metapán  0–1  Árabe Unido
Group B:
San Juan Jabloteh  0–1  D.C. United
Group C:
Puerto Rico Islanders  3–3  Cruz Azul

September 14, 2009 (Monday)

American football
NFL Monday Night Football week 1:
New England Patriots 25, Buffalo Bills 24
 Tom Brady throws for 378 yards and brings the Pats back from a late 24–13 deficit, connecting with Benjamin Watson on two touchdown passes in the final 2:10.
San Diego Chargers 24, Oakland Raiders 20
 After the Raiders take a late lead, Philip Rivers leads the Chargers on a 79-yard drive, capped off by a 5-yard TD run from Darren Sproles with 18 seconds left.

Basketball
EuroBasket in Poland: (teams in bold advance to the quarterfinals)
Group F in Łódź:
 84–70 
Lithuania fails to reach the top 8 for only the second time in 10 championships.
 76–60 
 64–69 (OT) 
Turkey shutout Serbia 5–0 in overtime.
Standings (after 4 games): Turkey 8 points, Slovenia 7, Serbia, Spain 6, Poland 5, Lithuania 4.

Cricket
Tri-series in Sri Lanka:
Final in Colombo:
 319/5 (50 ov, Sachin Tendulkar 138);  273 (46.4 ov). India win by 46 runs.

Cycling
Vuelta a España:
Stage 15 – Jaén to Córdoba, 168 km: (1) Lars Boom  4h 12' 56" (2) David Herrero  + 1' 36" (3) Dominik Roels  + 1' 44"
General classification: (1)  Alejandro Valverde  65h 08' 50" (2) Robert Gesink  + 31' (3) Samuel Sánchez  + 1' 10"

Rugby union
 SANZAR, the organising body of the Tri Nations and Super 14 competitions, announces that Argentina has provisionally been invited to join an expanded Tri Nations effective in 2012. (International Rugby Board)

Tennis
US Open, day 15: (seeding in parentheses)
Men's Singles, final:
Juan Martín del Potro  [6] def. Roger Federer  [1] 3–6, 7–6(5), 4–6, 7–6(4), 6–2
Del Potro wins his first Grand Slam tournament and stops Federer's streak of US Open titles at five. Del Potro also becomes the second Argentine to win the US Open men's singles after Guillermo Vilas in 1977, and the first ever South American to win a Grand Slam men's event on a hard court. His win also stops a streak of 21 Grand Slam men's titles won by European players since fellow Argentine Gastón Gaudio won the 2004 French Open.
Women's Doubles, final:
Serena Williams  / Venus Williams  [4] def. Cara Black  / Liezel Huber  [1] 6–2, 6–2
The Williams sisters win their second US Open doubles title and their tenth Grand Slam tournament.

September 13, 2009 (Sunday)

American football
NFL week 1:
Atlanta Falcons 19, Miami Dolphins 7
Baltimore Ravens 38, Kansas City Chiefs 24
 Joe Flacco throws for 307 yards and three touchdowns.
Philadelphia Eagles 38, Carolina Panthers 10
 The Eagles win with defense, forcing seven Panthers turnovers, five of them by quarterback Jake Delhomme, but lose Donovan McNabb to a broken rib.
Indianapolis Colts 14, Jacksonville Jaguars 12
Dallas Cowboys 34, Tampa Bay Buccaneers 21
 Tony Romo throws for 353 yards and three touchdowns.
New Orleans Saints 45, Detroit Lions 27
 Drew Brees throws for 358 yards and six TDs to lead the Saints.
New York Jets 24, Houston Texans 7
Minnesota Vikings 34, Cleveland Browns 20
 Brett Favre wins in his Vikings debut, led by Adrian Peterson, who runs for 180 yards and three TDs.
Denver Broncos 12, Cincinnati Bengals 7
 Brandon Stokley catches a tipped desperation pass from Kyle Orton and completes an 87-yard touchdown play with 11 seconds left to give the Broncos the win.
San Francisco 49ers 20, Arizona Cardinals 16
New York Giants 23, Washington Redskins 17
 After missing the entire 2008 season to injury, Osi Umenyiora scores on a fumble recovery to help lead the Giants.
Seattle Seahawks 28, St. Louis Rams 0
Green Bay Packers 21, Chicago Bears 15
 Aaron Rodgers connects with Greg Jennings for a 50-yard TD pass with 1:11 left for the win. Rodgers' counterpart, Jay Cutler, is intercepted four times. The Bears also lose Brian Urlacher for the season with a dislocated wrist.

Athletics
World Athletics Final in Thessaloniki, Greece:
Men:
200 m:  Usain Bolt  19.68 (CR)
1500 m:  William Biwott Tanui  3:35.04
5000 m:  Imane Merga  13:29.75
3000 m steeplechase:  Ezekiel Kemboi  8:04.38
110 m hurdles:  Ryan Brathwaite  13.16
Pole vault:  Maksym Mazuryk  5.70
Long jump:  Fabrice Lapierre  8.33 (wind 2.4)
Hammer:  Primož Kozmus  79.80
Javelin:  Andreas Thorkildsen  87.75
Women:
100 m:  Carmelita Jeter  10.67 (CR)
400 m:  Sanya Richards  49.95
800 m:  Anna Willard  2:00.20
3000 m:  Meseret Defar  8:30.15  (WL)
400 m hurdles:  Melaine Walker  53.36 (CR)
High jump:  Blanka Vlašić  2.04 (CR)
Triple jump:  Mabel Gay  14.62
Shot put:  Valerie Vili  21.07 (CR)
Discus:  Yarelis Barrios  65.86 (CR)

Auto racing
Formula One:
Italian Grand Prix at Monza:
(1) Rubens Barichello  (Brawn–Mercedes) 1:16:21.706 (2) Jenson Button  (Brawn-Mercedes) +2.872 (3) Kimi Räikkönen  (Ferrari) +30.664
Drivers' standings (after 13 of 17 races): (1) Button 80 points (2) Barrichello 66 (3) Sebastian Vettel  (Red Bull–Renault) 54
Constructors' standings: (1) Brawn-Mercedes 146 (2) Red Bull-Renault 105.5 (3)  Ferrari 62
V8 Supercars:
L&H 500 in Phillip Island, Victoria:
Round 17: (1) Will Davison  & Garth Tander  (Holden Commodore) (2) Jamie Whincup  & Craig Lowndes  (Ford Falcon) (3) Steven Richards  & Mark Winterbottom  (Ford Falcon)

Basketball
EuroBasket in Poland: (teams in bold advance to the quarterfinals)
Group E in Bydgoszcz:
 86–75 
 65–68 
 79–87 
Standings (after 4 games): France 8 points, Greece 7, Russia 6, Macedonia, Croatia, Germany 5.

Camogie
All-Ireland Championship Final in Dublin:
Cork  0–15 – 0-07  Kilkenny
Cork win the title for a second consecutive time.

Cycling
Vuelta a España:
Stage 14 – Granada to La Pandera, 157 km: (1) Damiano Cunego  4h 04' 23" (2) Jakob Fuglsang  + 2' 23" (3) Samuel Sánchez  + 3' 08"
General classification: (1)  Alejandro Valverde  60h 30' 53" (2) Robert Gesink  + 31' (3) Sánchez + 1' 10"

Football (soccer)
CAF Champions League group stage, round 5: (teams in bold advance to the semifinals)
Group A:
Kano Pillars  3–2  ZESCO United
Standings: Al-Hilal, Kano Pillars 10 points, ZESCO United 5, Al-Merreikh 2.

Golf
PGA Tour:
FedEx Cup Playoffs:
BMW Championship in Lemont, Illinois:
Winner: Tiger Woods  265 (−19)
 After firing a course-record 62 on Saturday, Woods cruises to his sixth tour win of the year by eight shots.
European Tour:
Mercedes-Benz Championship in Pulheim, Germany:
Winner: James Kingston  275 (−13)PO
Kingston wins his second European Tour title and 15th professional tournament.
LPGA Tour:
P&G Beauty NW Arkansas Championship in Rogers, Arkansas:
Winner: Jiyai Shin  275 (−9)PO
Shin wins her third LPGA title of the year in a playoff over Angela Stanford  and Sun Young Yoo .
Walker Cup Match in Ardmore, Pennsylvania
 Team USA  16½–9½  Team Great Britain & Ireland
 Team USA wins the Cup for the third consecutive time.

Gymnastics
Rhythmic Gymnastics World Championships in Ise, Mie, Japan:
Groups 5 Hoops:      
Groups 3 Ribbons + 2 Ropes:

Rugby league
NRL Finals Series:
Qualifying Finals:
St George Illawarra Dragons  12–25  Parramatta Eels
Eliminated from Finals Series: Manly-Warringah Sea Eagles , Newcastle Knights

Snooker
Shanghai Masters, final: (seeding in parentheses)
Ronnie O'Sullivan  (3) def. Liang Wenbo  10–5

Tennis
US Open, day 14: (seeding in parentheses)
Men's Singles, semifinals:
Roger Federer  [1] def. Novak Djokovic  [4] 7–6 (3), 7–5, 7–5
Juan Martín del Potro  [6] def. Rafael Nadal  [3] 6–2, 6–2, 6–2
Women's Singles, final:
Kim Clijsters  [WC] def. Caroline Wozniacki  [9] 7–5, 6–3
 Clijsters caps her comeback from a two-year retirement by becoming the first unseeded woman to win the US Open and the first mother to win a Grand Slam event since Evonne Goolagong won Wimbledon in 1980.
Men's Doubles, final:
Lukáš Dlouhý  / Leander Paes  [4] def. Mahesh Bhupathi  / Mark Knowles  [3] 3–6, 6–3, 6–2
Dlouhý and Paes win their second Grand Slam doubles title as a team, and Paes wins his second US Open and sixth Grand Slam title.

Volleyball
European Men's Championship in İzmir, Turkey:
Bronze medal match:   3–0 
Final:   3–1  
Poland win the title for the first time.
Asian Women's Championship in Hanoi, Vietnam:
Bronze medal match:  0–3  
Final:   1–3  
Thailand win the title for the first time.
Final Four Women's Cup in Lima, Peru:
Bronze medal match:   3–0 
Final:   3–1

September 12, 2009 (Saturday)

American football
 NCAA
 AP Top 10:
 (1) Florida 56, Troy 6
 (2) Texas 41, Wyoming 10
 (3) USC 18, (8) Ohio State 15
 (4) Alabama 40, Florida International 14
 Houston 45, (5) Oklahoma State 35
 (7) Penn State 28, Syracuse 7
 (9) Brigham Young 54, Tulane 3
 (10) California 59, Eastern Washington 7
 Other games:
 Michigan 38, (18) Notre Dame 34
 Akron 41, Morgan State 0
 The Zips make a winning debut at their new InfoCision Stadium.
 Minnesota 20, Air Force 13
 The Gophers do the same at their new TCF Bank Stadium.
NFL news:
Prosecutors in San Diego dismiss battery and false imprisonment charges made against San Diego Chargers linebacker Shawne Merriman by reality television personality Tila Tequila. (AP via ESPN)

Athletics
World Athletics Final in Thessaloniki, Greece:
Men:
100 m:  Tyson Gay  9.88
400 m:  LaShawn Merritt  44.93
800 m:  David Rudisha  1:44.85 CR
3000 m:  Kenenisa Bekele  8:03.79
400 m hurdles:  Kerron Clement  48.11
High jump:  Yaroslav Rybakov  2.34
Triple jump:  Arnie David Giralt  17.45
Shot put:  Christian Cantwell  22.07 CR
Discus:  Virgilijus Alekna  67.63
Women:
200 m:  Allyson Felix  22.29
1500 m:  Nancy Lagat  4:13.63
5000 m:  Meseret Defar  15:25.43
3000 m steeplechase:  Ruth Bosibori  9:13.43 CR
100 m hurdles:  Brigitte Foster-Hylton  12.58
Pole vault:  Yelena Isinbayeva  4.80
Long jump:  Brittney Reese  7.08 CR
Hammer:  Betty Heidler  72.03
Javelin:  Mariya Abakumova  64.60

Australian rules football
AFL finals series:
Semifinal 1 at the MCG, Melbourne:
Collingwood 12.11 (83)–11.12 (78) Adelaide

Auto racing
Sprint Cup Series:
Chevy Rock & Roll 400 in Richmond, Virginia:
 (1) Denny Hamlin  (Toyota, Joe Gibbs Racing) (2) Kurt Busch  (Dodge, Penske Championship Racing) (3) Jeff Gordon  (Chevrolet, Hendrick Motorsports)
Drivers qualifying for the Chase for the Sprint Cup — points through 26 races, followed by points entering the Chase in parentheses
Tony Stewart  (Chevrolet, Stewart Haas Racing) — 3806 (5030)
Gordon — 3627 (5010)
Jimmie Johnson  (Chevrolet, Hendrick Motorsports) — 3534 (5030)
Hamlin — 3491 (5020)
Kurt Busch — 3322 (5010)
Mark Martin  (Chevrolet, Hendrick Motorsports) — 3291 (5040)
Kasey Kahne  (Dodge, Richard Petty Motorsports) — 3280 (5020)
Carl Edwards  (Ford, Roush Fenway Racing) — 3280 (5000)
Ryan Newman  (Chevrolet, Stewart Haas Racing) — 3272 (5000)
Juan Pablo Montoya  (Chevrolet, Earnhardt Ganassi Racing) — 3251 (5000)
Greg Biffle  (Ford, Roush Fenway Racing) — 3249 (5000)
Brian Vickers  (Toyota, Red Bull Racing Team) — 3203 (5010)
Kurt Busch's brother Kyle Busch, tied with Martin for the most wins this season with four, falls eight points shy of a spot in the Chase.

Basketball
EuroBasket in Poland: (teams in bold advance to the quarterfinals)
Group F in Łódź:
 63–60 
 72–77 
 58–81 
Standings (after 3 games): Turkey 6 points, Slovenia, Serbia 5, Spain, Poland 4, Lithuania 3.

Boxing
World Amateur Championships in Milan, Italy, finals:
Light-flyweight (−48 kg):
Purevdorj Serdamba  bt David Ayrapetyan  10–5
Flyweight (−51 kg):
McWilliams Arroyo  bt Nyambayar Tugstsogt  18–2
Bantamweight (−54 kg):
Detelin Dalakliev  bt Eduard Abzalimov  5–3
Featherweight (−57 kg):
Vasyl Lomachenko  bt Sergey Vodopiyanov  12–1
Lightweight (−60 kg):
Domenico Valentino  bt Jose Pedraza  9–4
Light-welterweight (−64 kg):
Roniel Iglesias  bt Frankie Gomez  8–2
Welterweight (−69 kg):
Jack Culcay-Keth  bt Andrey Zamkovoy  7–4
Middleweight (−75 kg):
Abbos Atoev  bt Andranik Hakobyan  9–0
Light-heavyweight (−81 kg):
Artur Beterbiev  bt Elshod Rasulov  13–10
Heavyweight (−91 kg):
Egor Mekhontsev  bt Osmai Acosta  12–2
Super-heavyweight (+91 kg):
Roberto Cammarelle  bt Roman Kapitonenko  10–5

Cricket
Australia in England:
4th ODI at Lord's, London:
 220 (46.3 ov);  221/3 (43.4 ov). Australia win by 7 wickets and take an unassailable 4–0 lead in the 7-match series.
Tri-series in Sri Lanka:
 307/6 (50 ov);  168 (37.2 ov) in Colombo. Sri Lanka win by 139 runs.
Final standings: Sri Lanka 10 points, India 4, New Zealand 0.

Cycling
Vuelta a España:
Stage 13 – Berja to Sierra Nevada, 175 km: (1) David Moncoutié  5h 09' 22" (2) Ezequiel Mosquera  + 52" (3) Alejandro Valverde  + 1' 16"
General classification: (1)  Valverde 56h 23' 08" (2) Robert Gesink  + 27" (3) Ivan Basso  + 1' 02"

Football (soccer)
CAF Champions League group stage, round 5: (teams in bold advance to the semifinals)
Group B:
Heartland  2–0   TP Mazembe
Étoile du Sahel  2–0  Monomotapa United
Standings: Heartland 10 points, TP Mazembe 9, Étoile du Sahel 7, Monomotapa United 3.

Gymnastics
Rhythmic Gymnastics World Championships in Ise, Mie, Japan:
Groups All-Around:

Horse racing
English Triple Crown:
St. Leger Stakes in Doncaster:
Winner: Mastery  (jockey: Ted Durcan, trainer: Saeed bin Suroor)

Rugby league
NRL Finals Series:
Qualifying Finals:
Gold Coast Titans  32–40  Brisbane Broncos
Bulldogs  26–12  Newcastle Knights

Rugby union
Tri Nations Series:
 29–32  in Hamilton
Standings: South Africa 21 points (6 matches), New Zealand 9 (5),  7 (5)
The Springboks claim their third Tri Nations crown and their first since 2004.

Snooker
Shanghai Masters, semi-finals: (seeding in parentheses)
Liang Wenbo  def. Shaun Murphy  (5) 6–5
Ronnie O'Sullivan  (3) def. John Higgins  [2] 6–1

Tennis
US Open, day 13: (seeding in parentheses)
Men's Singles, quarterfinals:
Rafael Nadal  [3] def. Fernando González  [11] 7–6(4), 7–6(2), 6–0
Women's Singles, semifinals:
Kim Clijsters  def. Serena Williams  [2] 6–4, 7–5
Williams is given a code violation penalty at match point for yelling at a lineswoman.
Caroline Wozniacki  [9] def. Yanina Wickmayer  6–3, 6–3
Men's Doubles – Finals:
Lukáš Dlouhý  / Leander Paes  [4] vs. Mahesh Bhupathi  / Mark Knowles  [3] Cancelled

Volleyball
European Men's Championship in İzmir, Turkey:
Semifinals:
 3–0 
 2–3 
Asian Women's Championship in Hanoi, Vietnam:
Semifinals:
 3–1 
 1–3 
Final Four Women's Cup in Lima, Peru:
Semifinals:
 3–0 
 1–3

September 11, 2009 (Friday)

Australian rules football
AFL finals series:
Semifinal 2 at the MCG, Melbourne:
Western Bulldogs 16.11 (107)–8.8 (56) Brisbane Lions

Auto racing
Nationwide Series:
Virginia 529 College Savings 250 in Richmond, Virginia:
 (1) Carl Edwards  (Ford, Roush Fenway Racing) (2) Kevin Harvick  (Chevrolet, Kevin Harvick Incorporated) (3) Kyle Busch  (Toyota, Joe Gibbs Racing)

Basketball
EuroBasket in Poland: (teams in bold advance to the quarterfinals)
Group E in Bydgoszcz:
 62–59 
 76–84 
 83–57 
Standings (after 3 games): Greece, France 6 points, Russia, Germany, Croatia 4, Macedonia 3.
Five new members are inducted to the Hall of Fame:
Players: John Stockton, David Robinson, Michael Jordan
Coaches: C. Vivian Stringer, Jerry Sloan

Boxing
World Amateur Championships in Milan, Italy, semifinals:
Light-flyweight (−48 kg):
Purevdorj Serdamba  bt Li Jiazhao  11–7
David Ayrapetyan  bt Shin Jong-Hun  9–1
Flyweight (−51 kg):
McWilliams Arroyo  bt Ronny Beblik  9–7
Nyambayar Tugstsogt  bt Misha Aloyan  8–7
Bantamweight (−54 kg):
Detelin Dalakliev  bt Yankiel León  5–0
Eduard Abzalimov  bt John-Joe Nevin  5–4
Featherweight (−57 kg):
Vasyl Lomachenko  bt Óscar Valdez  12–1
Sergey Vodopiyanov  bt Bahodirjon Sultonov  7–5
Lightweight (−60 kg):
Domenico Valentino  bt Koba Pkhakadze  15–2
Jose Pedraza  bt Albert Selimov  9–5
Light-welterweight (−64 kg):
Roniel Iglesias  bt Uranchimeg Munkh  6–4
Frankie Gomez  bt Gyula Kate  8–7
Welterweight (−69 kg):
Jack Culcay-Keth  bt Botirjon Mahmudov  6–4
Andrey Zamkovoy  bt Serik Sapiyev  16–10
Middleweight (−75 kg):
Abbos Atoev  bt Vijender Singh  7–3
Andranik Hakobyan  bt Alfonso Blanco  4–3
Light-heavyweight (−81 kg):
Artur Beterbiev  bt Jose Larduet  10–6
Elshod Rasulov  bt Abdelkader Bouhenia  8–4
Heavyweight (−91 kg):
Osmai Acosta  bt John M'Bumba  9–2
Egor Mekhontsev  bt Oleksandr Usyk  14–10
Super-heavyweight (+91 kg):
Roberto Cammarelle  bt Viktar Zuyeu  retired
Roman Kapitonenko  bt Zhang Zhilei  5–2

Cricket
Tri-series in Sri Lanka:
 155 (46.3 ov);  156/4 (40.3 ov) in Colombo. India win by 6 wickets .
Standings: Sri Lanka 5 points, India 4, New Zealand 0.
Sri Lanka and India advance to the final.

Cycling
Vuelta a España:
Stage 12 – Almería to Alto de Velefique, 174 km: (1) Ryder Hesjedal  5h 34' 31" (2) David García  + 1" (3) Robert Gesink  + 6"
General classification: (1)  Alejandro Valverde  51h 12' 38" (2) Cadel Evans  + 7" (3) Gesink + 18"

Football (soccer)
CAF Champions League group stage, round 5:
Group A:
Al-Hilal  3–1  Al-Merreikh
Standings: Al-Hilal 10 points (5 matches), Kano Pillars 7 (4), ZESCO United 5 (4), Al-Merreikh 2 (5).

Gymnastics
Rhythmic Gymnastics World Championships in Ise, Mie, Japan:
Individual All-Around:  Evgenia Kanaeva   Daria Kondakova   Anna Bessonova 
Kanaeva wins six gold medals.

Rugby league
NRL Finals Series:
Qualifying Final:
Melbourne Storm  40–12  Manly-Warringah Sea Eagles

Snooker
Shanghai Masters, quarter-finals: (seeding in parentheses)
Liang Wenbo  def. Ricky Walden  (1) 5–3
Shaun Murphy  (5) def. Ken Doherty  5–0
Ronnie O'Sullivan  (3) def. Ding Junhui  [14] 5–3
John Higgins  (2) def. Ryan Day  [7] 5–1

Tennis
US Open, day 12: (seeding in parentheses)
Women's Singles, semifinals:
Kim Clijsters  vs. Serena Williams  [2] Cancelled
Yanina Wickmayer  vs. Caroline Wozniacki  [9] Cancelled
Men's Singles, quarterfinals:
Fernando González  [11] vs. Rafael Nadal  [3] 6–7(4), 6–6 (2–3) Suspended
Men's Doubles – Finals:
Lukáš Dlouhý /Leander Paes  [4] vs. Mahesh Bhupathi /Mark Knowles  [3] Cancelled

Volleyball
Asian Women's Championship in Hanoi, Vietnam:
Quarterfinals:
 3–0 
 3–0 
 3–0 
 1–3 
Final Four Women's Cup in Lima, Peru:
Preliminary Round:
 0–3 
 3–0 
Standings: Brazil 6 points, Dominican Republic 5, USA 4, Peru 3.

September 10, 2009 (Thursday)

American football
NFL week 1:
Pittsburgh Steelers 13, Tennessee Titans 10 (OT)

Football (soccer)
Women's Euro in Finland:
Final:  2–6 
Germany win the title for the fifth consecutive time and seventh overall.

Gymnastics
Rhythmic Gymnastics World Championships in Ise, Mie, Japan:
Individual Ball:  Evgenia Kanaeva   Aliya Garayeva   Anna Bessonova 
Individual Ribbon:  Evgenia Kanaeva   Anna Bessonova   Silviya Miteva 
Team All-Around:   (Evgenia Kanaeva, Daria Kondakova, Daria Dmitrieva, Olga Kapranova)   (Melitina Staniouta, Svetlana Rudalova, Liubou Charkashyna)   (Zeynab Javadli, Anna Gurbanova, Aliya Garayeva)

Snooker
Shanghai Masters, last 16: (seeding in parentheses)
Ding Junhui  (14) def. Stuart Bingham  5–2
John Higgins  (2) def. Mark Williams  5–1
Shaun Murphy  (5) def. Jamie Cope  5–0
Ken Doherty  def. Barry Hawkins  5–4
Ronnie O'Sullivan  (3) def. Marco Fu  (9) 5–2
Ricky Walden  (1) def. Stephen Hendry  (11) 5–1
Liang Wenbo  def. Ali Carter  (6) 5–0
Ryan Day  (7) def. Matthew Stevens  5–1

Tennis
US Open, day 11: (seeding in parentheses)
Men's Singles, quarterfinals:
Juan Martín del Potro  [6] def. Marin Čilić  [16] 4–6, 6–3, 6–2, 6–1
Fernando González  [11] vs. Rafael Nadal  [3] 6–7(4), 6–6 (2–3) Suspended
Mixed Doubles, final:
Carly Gullickson  / Travis Parrott  def. Cara Black /Leander Paes  [2] 6–2, 6–4
Gullickson and Parrott both win their first Grand Slam title.

Volleyball
European Men's Championship in İzmir and İstanbul, Turkey: (teams in bold advance to the semifinals)
Pool E in Izmir:
 3–1 
 3–1 
 3–0 
Standings: Poland 10 points, France 9, Germany 8, Greece 7, Spain 6, Slovakia 5.
Pool F in Istanbul:
 3–0 
 0–3 
 1–3 
Standings: Russia 10 points, Bulgaria 9, Serbia 8, Netherlands 7, Italy 6, Finland 5.
Asian Women's Championship in Hanoi, Vietnam:
Pool E:
 0–3 
 0–3 
Standings: China 6 points, Kazakhstan 5, Vietnam 4, Iran 3.
Pool F:
 0–3 
 3–1 
Standings: Japan 6 points, Korea 5, Thailand 4, Chinese Taipei 3.
Final Four Women's Cup in Lima, Peru:
Preliminary Round:
 3–0 
 3–1 
Standings: Brazil 4 points, Dominican Republic, USA 3, Peru 2.

Windsurfing
Neil Pryde RS:X World Championships in Weymouth and Portland, England:
Men:  Nick Dempsey  24.0 points  Nimrod Mashiah  42.0  Dorian van Rijsselberge  46.0
Women:  Marina Alabau  28.0 points  Blanca Manchon  36.0  Charline Picon  44.0

September 9, 2009 (Wednesday)

Basketball
EuroBasket in Poland: (teams in bold advance to the second round)
Group A in Poznań:
 71–81 
 80–106 
Standings: Greece 6 points, Croatia 5, Macedonia 4, Israel 3.
Israel is eliminated in the first round for the first time since 1993, and fails to win any game for the first time ever.
Group B in Gdańsk:
 64–69 
 62–68 
Standings: France 6 points, Russia, Germany, Latvia 4.
Group C in Warsaw:
 90–84 (OT) 
 59–77 
Standings: Slovenia, Serbia, Spain 5 points, Great Britain 3.
Group D in Wrocław:
 69–87 
 84–69 
Standings: Turkey 6 points, Poland 5, Lithuania 4, Bulgaria 3.

Cricket
Australia in England:
3rd ODI in Southampton:
 228/9 (50 ov);  230/4 (48.3 ov, Cameron White 105). Australia win by 6 wickets. Australia lead the 7-match series 3–0.

Cycling
Vuelta a España:
Stage 11 – Murcia to Caravaca de la Cruz, 191 km: (1) Tyler Farrar  5h 11' 10" (2) Philippe Gilbert  + 0" (3) Marco Marcato  + 0"
General classification: (1)  Alejandro Valverde  45h 37' 51" (2) Cadel Evans  + 7" (3) Robert Gesink  + 36"

Football (soccer)
2010 FIFA World Cup qualification: (teams in bold qualify for 2010 FIFA World Cup, teams in italics secure playoff berths)
Europe:
Group 1:
 0–1 
 1–1 
 0–1 
Standings: Denmark 18 points, Sweden 15, Portugal, Hungary 13.
Group 2:
 7–0 
 2–2 
 1–1 
Standings: Switzerland 17 points, Greece, Latvia 14, Israel 12.
Group 3:
 7–0 
 0–2 
 3–0 
Standings: Slovakia 19 points (8 matches), Slovenia 14 (8), Northern Ireland 14 (9), Czech Republic 12 (8), Poland 11 (8).
Group 4:
 1–1 
 1–3 
 4–0 
Standings: Germany 22 points, Russia 21, Finland 14.
Group 5:
 1–1 
 2–1 
 3–0 
Standings: Spain 24 points, Bosnia-Herzegovina 16, Turkey 12.
Group 6:
 5–1 
 1–3 
 0–0 
Standings: England 24 points, Croatia 17, Ukraine 15.
Group 7:
 2–1 
 1–1 
 1–1 
Standings: Serbia 19 points, France 15, Austria 11, Lithuania, Romania 9.
Group 8:
 1–1 
 2–0 
Standings: Italy 20 points, Ireland 16, Bulgaria 11.
Group 9:
 2–1 
 0–1 
Final standings: Netherlands 24 points, Norway, Scotland 10.
South America round 16:
 1–3 
 3–1 
 1–0 
 3–1 
 4–2 
Standings: Brazil 33 points, Paraguay 30, Chile 27, Ecuador 23, Argentina 22, Uruguay, Venezuela 21, Colombia 20.
Africa third round:
Group A:
 2–1 
Standings: Cameroon 7 points, Gabon 6, Togo 5, Morocco 3.
North & Central America fourth round, matchday 8:
 0–1 
 1–0 
 1–0 
Standings: USA 16 points, Mexico 15, Honduras 13, Costa Rica 12, El Salvador 8, Trinidad and Tobago 5.
Asia fifth round, second leg: (first leg score in parentheses)
 2–2 (0–0) . 2–2 on aggregate, Bahrain win on away goals.
Bahrain will play against  in Inter-confederation Playoffs.

Snooker
Shanghai Masters, last 32: (seeding in parentheses)
Ding Junhui  (14) def. Stephen Lee  5–2
Shaun Murphy  (5) def. Michael Holt  5–1
Ali Carter  (6) def. Tian Pengfei  5–3
Jamie Cope  def. Joe Perry  (13) 5–4
Ronnie O'Sullivan  (3) def. Graeme Dott  5–0
Barry Hawkins  walkover Stephen Maguire  (4)
Matthew Stevens  def. Mark Allen  (12) 5–2
Mark Williams  (16) def. Joe Swail  5–3

Tennis
US Open, day 10: (seeding in parentheses)
Men's Singles, quarterfinals:
Novak Djokovic  [4] def. Fernando Verdasco  [10]  7–6 (2), 1–6, 7–5, 6–2
Roger Federer  [1] def. Robin Söderling  [12] 6–0, 6–3, 6–7(6), 7–6(6)
Women's Singles, quarterfinals:
Yanina Wickmayer  def. Kateryna Bondarenko  7–5, 6–4
Caroline Wozniacki  [9] def. Melanie Oudin  6–2, 6–2

Volleyball
European Men's Championship in İzmir and İstanbul, Turkey: (teams in bold advance to the semifinals)
Pool E in Izmir:
 1–3 
 2–3 
 1–3 
Standings: Poland 8 points, France 7, Germany, Greece 6, Spain 5, Slovakia 4.
Pool F in Istanbul:
 0–3 
 3–1 
 3–0 
Standings: Russia, Bulgaria 8 points, Serbia, Netherlands 6, Italy, Finland 4.
Asian Women's Championship in Hanoi, Vietnam:
Pool E:
 3–0 
 1–3 
Standings: China 4 points, Vietnam, Kazakhstan 3, Iran 2.
Pool F:
 3–0 
 3–0 
Standings: Japan, Korea 4 points, Thailand, Chinese Taipei 2.
Final Four Women's Cup in Lima, Peru:
Preliminary Round:
 3–2 
 3–0 
Standings: Dominican Republic, Brazil 2 points, USA, Peru 1.

September 8, 2009 (Tuesday)

Basketball
EuroBasket in Poland: (All times CET, teams in bold advance to the second round)
Group A in Poznań:
 79–82 
 76–68 
Group B in Gdańsk:
 76–73 
 51–60 
Group C in Warsaw:
 80–69 
 84–76 
Group D in Wrocław:
 75–86 
 66–94

Cricket
Tri-series in Sri Lanka:
 216/7 (50 ov, Thilan Samaraweera 104);  119 (36.1 ov) in Colombo. Sri Lanka win by 97 runs.

Cycling
Vuelta a España:
Stage 10 – Alicante to Murcia, 186 km: (1) Simon Gerrans  3h 56' 19" (2) Ryder Hesjedal  + 0" (3) Jakob Fuglsang  + 0"
General classification: (1)  Alejandro Valverde  40h 26' 41" (2) Cadel Evans  + 7" (3) Robert Gesink  + 36"

Gymnastics
Rhythmic Gymnastics World Championships in Ise, Mie, Japan:
Individual Rope:  Evgenia Kanaeva   Daria Kondakova   Anna Bessonova 
Individual Hoop:  Evgenia Kanaeva   Daria Kondakova   Melitina Staniouta

Snooker
Shanghai Masters, last 32: (seeding in parentheses)
Ricky Walden  (1) def. Mark King  5–1
Stephen Hendry  (11) def. Marcus Campbell  5–4
Marco Fu  (9) def. Nigel Bond  5–4
Ryan Day  (7) def. Li Yan 5–3
Liang Wenbo  def. Peter Ebdon  (15) 5–1
Ken Doherty  def. Neil Robertson  (10) 5–4
Stuart Bingham  def. Mark Selby  (8) 5–3
John Higgins  (2) def. Matthew Selt  5–2

Tennis
US Open, day 9: (seeding in parentheses)
Men's Singles, fourth round:
Marin Čilić  [16] def. Andy Murray  [2] 7–5, 6–2, 6–2
Rafael Nadal  [3] def. Gaël Monfils  [13] 6–7(3), 6–3, 6–1, 6–3
Juan Martín del Potro  [6] def. Juan Carlos Ferrero  [24] 6–3, 6–3, 6–3
Fernando González  [11] def. Jo-Wilfried Tsonga  [7] 3–6, 6–3, 7–6(3), 6–4
Women's Singles, quarterfinals:
Serena Williams  [2] def. Flavia Pennetta  [10] 6–4, 6–3
Kim Clijsters  def. Li Na  [18] 6–2, 6–4

Volleyball
European Men's Championship in İzmir and İstanbul, Turkey:
Pool E in Izmir:
 3–1 
 3–2 
 3–1 
Standings: Poland 6 points, France, Greece 5, Germany, Spain 4, Slovakia 3.
Pool F in Istanbul:
 3–1 
 3–1 
 0–3 
Standings: Bulgaria, Russia 6 points, Netherlands 5, Serbia 4, Italy, Finland 3.

September 7, 2009 (Monday)

American college football
NCAA AP Top 25:
Miami 38, (18) Florida State 34

Basketball
EuroBasket in Poland:
Group A in Poznań:
 54–86 
 86–79 
Group B in Gdańsk:
 81–68 
 70–65 
Group C in Warsaw:
 59–72 
 66–57 
Group D in Wrocław:
 90–78 
 84–76

Cycling
Vuelta a España:
Stage 9 – Alcoy to Xorret del Catí, 186 km: (1) Gustavo César  5h 21' 04" (2) Marco Marzano  + 21" (3) Alejandro Valverde  + 40"
General classification: (1)  Valverde 36h 26' 40" (2) Cadel Evans  + 7" (3) Robert Gesink  + 36"

Football (soccer)
Women's Euro in Finland:
Semi-final:  3–1 
Defending champion Germany advance to the final for the fifth straight time.

Golf
PGA Tour:
FedEx Cup Playoffs:
Deutsche Bank Championship in Norton, Massachusetts:
Winner: Steve Stricker  267 (−17)

Snooker
Shanghai Masters, Wildcard round:
Marcus Campbell  def. Tang Jun  5–1
Tian Pengfei  def. Andrew Higginson  5–1
Ken Doherty  def. Aditya Mehta  5–0
Graeme Dott  def. Mohammed Shehab  5–3
Nigel Bond  def. Yu Delu  5–4
Li Yan  def. Gerard Greene  5–4
Matthew Selt  def. Shi Hanqing  5–0

Tennis
US Open, day 8: (seeding in parentheses)
Men's Singles, fourth round:
Roger Federer  [1] def. Tommy Robredo  [14] 7–5, 6–2, 6–2
Novak Djokovic  [4] def. Radek Štěpánek  [15] 6–1, 6–3, 6–3
Fernando Verdasco  [10] def. John Isner  4–6, 6–4, 6–4, 6–4
Robin Söderling  [12] def. Nikolay Davydenko  [8] 7–5, 3–6, 6–2 Ret.
 For the first time in the Open Era, no American man advances to the quarterfinals of the US Open.
Women's Singles, fourth round:
Caroline Wozniacki  [9] def. Svetlana Kuznetsova  [6] 2–6 7–6(5) 7–6(3)
Melanie Oudin  def. Nadia Petrova  [13] 1–6, 7–6(2), 6–3
Kateryna Bondarenko  def. Gisela Dulko  6–0, 6–0
Yanina Wickmayer  def. Petra Kvitová  4–6, 6–4, 7–5

Volleyball
Asian Women's Championship in Hanoi, Vietnam: (teams in bold advance to the second round)
Pool A:
 3–1 
 0–3 
Standings: Vietnam 6 points, Iran 5, Australia 4, Sri Lanka 3.
Pool B:
 3–0 
Standings:  Japan (Heian period) 4 points, Chinese Taipei 3, Uzbekistan 2.
Pool C:
 3–0 
Standings: China 4 points, Kazakhstan 3, Hong Kong 2.
Pool D:
 0–3 
 3–0 
Standings: South Korea 6 points, Thailand 5, India 4, Indonesia 3.

September 6, 2009 (Sunday)

American college football
NCAA AP Top 10:
(8) Mississippi 45, Memphis 14

Australian rules football
AFL finals series
Qualifying Final 1 in Melbourne:
St Kilda 12.8 (80)–7.10 (52) Collingwood

Auto racing
Sprint Cup Series:
Pep Boys Auto 500 in Hampton, Georgia:
 (1) Kasey Kahne  (Dodge, Richard Petty Motorsports) (2) Kevin Harvick  (Chevrolet, Richard Childress Racing) (3) Juan Pablo Montoya  (Chevrolet, Earnhardt Ganassi Racing)
Drivers' standings (after 25 of 26 races leading to the Chase for the Sprint Cup): (1) Tony Stewart  3694 points (Chevrolet, Stewart Haas Racing (2) Jeff Gordon  3457 (Chevrolet, Hendrick Motorsports) (3) Jimmie Johnson  3404 (Chevrolet, Hendrick Motorsports)
 Denny Hamlin  becomes the fourth driver to secure his spot in the Chase.
World Rally Championship:
Rally Australia:

Basketball
Americas Championship in San Juan, Puerto Rico:
3rd Place:  73–88  
Final:   61–60

Cricket
Australia in England:
2nd ODI at Lord's, London:
 249/8 (50 overs);  210 (46.1 overs). Australia win by 39 runs. Australia lead the 7-match series 2–0.

Cue sports
World Cup of Pool in Quezon City, Philippines:
Semifinals:
(5) Francisco Bustamante/Efren Reyes  def. (9) Fu Jian-bo/Li He-wen   9–8
(3) Thorsten Hohmann/Ralf Souquet  def. (2) Ronato Alcano/Dennis Orcollo   9–6
Final:
Bustamante/Reyes def. Hohmann/Souquet 11–9

Cycling
Vuelta a España:
Stage 8 – Alzira to Alto de Aitana, 206 km: (1) Damiano Cunego  6h 04' 54" (2) David Moncoutié  + 33" (3) Robert Gesink  + 36"
General classification: (1)  Cadel Evans  31h 05' 02" (2) Alejandro Valverde  + 2" (3) Samuel Sánchez  + 8"
Mountain Bike World Championships in Canberra, Australia:
Downhill men:  Steve Peat  2:30.33  Greg Minnaar  + 0.05  Michael Hannah  + 0.69
Downhill women:  Emmeline Ragot  2:50.05  Tracy Moseley  + 2.49  Kathleen Pruitt  + 4.84

Football (soccer)
2010 FIFA World Cup qualification: (teams in bold qualify for 2010 FIFA World Cup)
Africa third round, matchday 4:
Group A:
 1–1 
Standings: Gabon 6 points (3 matches), Togo 5, Cameroon 4 (3), Morocco 3.
Group B:
 1–0 
 2–2 
Standings: Tunisia 8 points, Nigeria 6, Mozambique 4, Kenya 3.
Group C:
 1–0 
Standings: Algeria 10 points, Egypt 7, Zambia 4, Rwanda 1.
Group D:
 1–1 
 2–0 
Standings: Ghana 12 points, Mali 5, Benin 4, Sudan 1.
Women's Euro in Finland:
Semi-final:  2–1 (ET) 
England advance to the final for the first time since 1984.

Golf
European Tour:
Omega European Masters in Crans-Montana, Switzerland:
Winner: Alexander Norén  264 (−20)
LPGA Tour:
Canadian Women's Open in Priddis Greens, Alberta, Canada:
Winner: Suzann Pettersen  269 (−15)

Hurling
All-Ireland Championship Final in Dublin::
Kilkenny  2–22 – 0–23  Tipperary
Kilkenny win the title for the fourth consecutive time, a feat only achieved previously by Cork in 1941–44.

Motorcycle racing
Moto GP:
San Marino Grand Prix in Misano:
(1) Valentino Rossi  (Yamaha) 44:32.882 (2) Jorge Lorenzo  (Yamaha) +2.416 (3) Dani Pedrosa  (Honda) +12.400
Riders' standings (after 13 of 17 races): (1) Rossi 237 points (2) Lorenzo 207 (3) Pedrosa 157
Manufacturers' standings: (1) Yamaha 305 points (2) Honda 220 (3) Ducati 191
Superbike:
Nürburgring Superbike World Championship round in Nürburg, Germany:
Race 1: (1) Ben Spies  (Yamaha) 39:04.818 (2) Noriyuki Haga  (Ducati) +3.850 (3) Carlos Checa  (Honda) +6.990
Race 2: (1) Jonathan Rea  (Honda) 39:01.561 (2) Spies +0.786 (3) Checa +4.993
Riders' standings (after 11 of 14 rounds): (1) Spies 364 points (2) Haga 346 (3) Michel Fabrizio  (Ducati) 286
Manufacturers' standings: (1) Ducati 383 points (2) Yamaha 337 (3) Honda 273

Tennis
US Open, day 7: (seeding in parentheses)
Men's Singles, third round:
Rafael Nadal  [3] def. Nicolás Almagro  [32] 7–5, 6–4, 6–4
Taylor Dent  def. Andy Murray  [2] 6–3, 6–2, 6–2
Juan Carlos Ferrero  [24] def. Gilles Simon  [9] 1–6, 6–4, 7–6 (7/5), 1–0, retired
Juan Martín del Potro  [6] def. Daniel Köllerer  6–1, 3–6, 6–3, 6–3
Jo-Wilfried Tsonga  [7] defs. Julien Benneteau  7–6(4), 6–2, 6–4
Women's Singles, fourth round:
Serena Williams  [2] def. Daniela Hantuchová  [22] 6–2, 6–0
Kim Clijsters  def. Venus Williams  [3] 6–0, 0–6, 6–4
Flavia Pennetta  [10] def. Vera Zvonareva  [7] 3–6, 7–6 (6), 6–0
Pennetta saves 6 match points in the second set.
Li Na  [18] def. Francesca Schiavone  [26] 6–2, 6–3

Volleyball
European Men's Championship in İzmir and İstanbul, Turkey: (teams in bold advance to the second round)
Pool A in Izmir:
 0–3 
Standings: Poland 6 points, France 5, Germany 4, Turkey 3.
Pool B in Istanbul:
 3–0 
Standings: Russia 6 points, Netherlands 5, Finland 4, Estonia 3.
Pool C in Izmir:
 1–3 
 2–3 
Standings: Greece 6 points, Spain 5, Slovakia 4, Slovenia 3.
Pool D in Istanbul:
 3–1 
 1–3 
Standings: Bulgaria 6 points, Serbia 5, Italy 4, Czech Republic 3.
Asian Women's Championship in Hanoi, Vietnam: (teams in bold advance to the second round)
Pool A:
 3–0 
 3–0 
Pool B:
 0–3 
Pool C:
 0–3 
Pool D:
 3–2 
 2–3

September 5, 2009 (Saturday)

American college football
NCAA AP Top 10:
(1) Florida 62, Charleston Southern 3
(2) Texas 59, Louisiana–Monroe 20
(20) Brigham Young 14, (3) Oklahoma 13
The Sooners' quarterback, 2008 Heisman Trophy winner Sam Bradford, has a sprained right (throwing) shoulder and is expected to miss 2 to 4 weeks.
(4) USC 56, San Jose State 3
(5) Alabama 34, (7) Virginia Tech 24
(6) Ohio State 31, Navy 27
(9) Penn State 31, Akron 7
(9) Oklahoma State 24, (13) Georgia 10

Australian rules football
AFL finals series:
Qualifying Final 2 in Melbourne:
Geelong 14.12 (96) – 12.10 (82) Western Bulldogs
Elimination Final 2 in Brisbane:
Brisbane Lions 16.15 (111) – 15.14 (104) Carlton

Auto racing
Nationwide Series:
Degree Men V12 300 in Hampton, Georgia:
 (1) Kevin Harvick  (Chevrolet, Kevin Harvick Incorporated) (2) Kyle Busch  (Toyota, Joe Gibbs Racing) (3) Dale Earnhardt Jr.  (Chevrolet, JR Motorsports)

Basketball
Americas Championship in San Juan, Puerto Rico:
Semifinals:
 73–65 
 85–80

Cue sports
World Cup of Pool in Quezon City, Philippines:
Quarterfinals:
(9) Fu Jian-bo/Li He-wen  def. (1) Rodney Morris/Shane Van Boening  9–5
(5) Francisco Bustamante/Efren Reyes  def. (4) Darren Appleton/Imran Majid  9–1
(3) Thorsten Hohmann/Ralf Souquet  def. (6) Niels Feijen/Nick van den Berg  9–7
(2) Ronato Alcano/Dennis Orcollo  def. (10) Radosław Babica/Mateusz Śniegocki  9–5

Cycling
Vuelta a España:
Stage 7 – Valencia, 30 km (ITT): (1) Fabian Cancellara  36' 41" (2) David Millar  + 32" (3) Bert Grabsch  + 36"
General classification: (1)  Cancellara 24h 58' 12" (2) Tom Boonen  + 51" (3) David Herrero  + 59"
Mountain Bike World Championships in Canberra, Australia:
Cross-country men:  Nino Schurter  2h 04' 39"  Julien Absalon  + 3"  Florian Vogel  + 58"
Cross-country women:  Irina Kalentieva  1h 43' 20"  Lene Byberg  + 13"  Willow Koerber  + 52"

Football (soccer)
2010 FIFA World Cup qualification: (teams in bold qualify for 2010 FIFA World Cup)
Europe:
Group 1:
 1–1 
 1–2 
Standings (after 7 matches): Denmark 17 points, Hungary 13, Sweden 12, Portugal 10.
Group 2:
 0–0 
 2–0 
 0–1 
Standings (after 7 matches): Switzerland 16 points, Greece, Latvia 13.
Group 3:
 2–2 
 1–1 
Standings (after 7 matches): Slovakia 16 points, Northern Ireland 14 (8 matches), Poland, Slovenia 11.
Group 4:
 3–0 
 1–2 
Standings (after 7 matches): Germany 19 points, Russia 18, Finland 13.
Group 5:
 0–2 
 4–2 
 5–0 
Standings (after 7 matches): Spain 21 points, Bosnia-Herzegovina 15, Turkey 11.
Group 6:
 5–0 
 1–0 
Standings (after 7 matches): England 21 points, Croatia 17 (8 matches), Ukraine 14.
Group 7:
 3–1 
 1–1 
Standings (after 7 matches): Serbia 18 points, France 14, Austria 10.
Group 8:
 4–1 
 1–2 
 0–2 
Standings (after 7 matches): Italy 17 points, Ireland 16 (8 matches), Bulgaria 11.
Group 9:
 2–0 
 1–1 
Standings (after 7 matches, one match remaining): Netherlands 21 points, Scotland 10, Norway, Macedonia 7.
South America round 15:
 1–0 
 2–0 
 1–0 
 1–3 
 2–2 
Standings: Brazil 30 points, Chile, Paraguay 27, Argentina 22, Colombia, Ecuador 20, Uruguay, Venezuela 18.
Africa third round, matchday 4:
Group A:
 0–2 
Standings (after 3 matches): Gabon 6 points, Cameroon, Togo 4, Morocco 2.
Group C:
 0–1 
Standings: Algeria 7 points (3 matches), Egypt 7 (4), Zambia 4 (3), Rwanda 1 (4).
Group E:
 2–1 
 5–0 
Standings (after 4 matches): Côte d'Ivoire 12 points, Burkina Faso 6, Guinea, Malawi 3.
Côte d'Ivoire all but mathematically qualify for 2010 FIFA World Cup.
North & Central America fourth round, matchday 7:
 2–1 
 4–1 
 0–3 
Standings: Honduras, United States 13 points, Mexico, Costa Rica 12, El Salvador, Trinidad and Tobago 5.
Asia fifth round, first leg:
 0–0 
Friendly international matches:
 3–0 
 3–1 
 2–1 
 2–0

Rugby union
Tri Nations Series:
 21–6  in Brisbane
Australia win their first match of the tournament and South Africa suffer their first loss.
Standings: South Africa 17 points (5 matches), New Zealand 8 (4), Australia 7 (5).

Tennis
US Open, day 6: (seeding in parentheses)
Men's Singles, third round:
Roger Federer  [1] def. Lleyton Hewitt  [31] 4–6, 6–3, 7–5, 6–4
Novak Djokovic  [4] def. Jesse Witten  6–7(2), 6–3, 7–6(2), 6–4
John Isner  def. Andy Roddick  [5] 7–6(3), 6–3, 3–6, 5–7, 7–6(5)
Nikolay Davydenko  [8] def. Marco Chiudinelli  6–4, 7–5, 7–5
Fernando Verdasco  [10] def. Tommy Haas  [20] 3–6, 7–5, 7–6(8), 1–6, 6–4
Women's Singles, third round:
Petra Kvitová  def. Dinara Safina  [1] 6–4, 2–6, 7–6(5)
Svetlana Kuznetsova  [6] def. Shahar Pe'er  7–5, 6–1
Caroline Wozniacki  [9] def. Sorana Cîrstea  [24] 6–3, 6–2

Volleyball
European Men's Championship in İzmir and İstanbul, Turkey: (teams in bold advance to the second round)
Pool A in Izmir:
 3–1 
 0–3 
Standings: Poland 6 points (3 matches), Germany 4 (3), France 3 (2), Turkey 2 (2).
Pool B in Istanbul:
 3–2 
 3–0 
Standings: Netherlands 5 points (3 matches), Russia 4 (2), Finland 3 (2), Estonia 3 (3).
Pool C in Izmir:
 2–3 
Standings (after 2 matches): Greece 4 points, Slovakia, Spain 3, Slovenia 2.
Pool D in Istanbul:
 0–3 
Standings (after 2 matches): Bulgaria 4 points, Serbia, Italy 3, Czech Republic 2.
Asian Women's Championship in Hanoi, Vietnam:
Pool A:
 3–0 
 3–0 
Pool B:
 3–0 
Pool C:
 3–0 
Pool D:
 0–3 
 0–3

September 4, 2009 (Friday)

Athletics
Golden League:
Memorial van Damme in Brussels, Belgium: (GL indicates Golden League event, athletes in bold share the US$1 million jackpot)
Men:
100 Metres GL:  Asafa Powell  9.90
200 Metres:  Usain Bolt  19.57
400 Metres GL:  Jeremy Wariner  44.94
800 Metres:  David Rudisha  1:45.80
5000 Metres GL:  Kenenisa Bekele  12:55.33
3000 Metres Steeplechase:  Paul Kipsiele Koech  8:04.05
110 Metres Hurdles GL:  Ryan Brathwaite  13.30
Javelin Throw GL:  Tero Pitkämäki  86.23
4x1500 Metres Relay:   14:36.23 WR
Women:
100 Metres GL:  Carmelita Jeter  10.88
400 Metres GL:  Sanya Richards  48.83
800 Metres:  Anna Willard  1:59.14
2000 Metres:  Gelete Burika  5:30.19
100 Metres Hurdles GL:  Brigitte Foster-Hylton  12.48
High Jump GL:  Blanka Vlašić  2.00
Pole Vault GL:  Elena Isinbaeva  4.70
Triple Jump:  Yamilé Aldama  14.27

Australian rules football
AFL finals series
Elimination Final 1 in West Lakes, South Australia
Adelaide 26.10 (166)–10.10 (70) Essendon

Basketball
Americas Championship in San Juan, Puerto Rico: (teams in bold advance to the semifinals and qualify for 2010 World Championship)
Quarter Final Round:
 67–74 
 73–66 
 76–80 
 82–86 
Final standings: Brazil, Puerto Rico, Argentina 13 points; Canada, Dominican Republic 10; Uruguay 9; Mexico, Panama 8.

Cricket
Australia in England:
1st ODI at The Oval, London:
 260/5 (50 ov);  256/8 (50.0 ov). Australia win by 4 runs. Australia lead the 7-match series 1–0.
New Zealand in Sri Lanka:
2nd T20I in Colombo:
 170/4 (20/20 ov);  148/8 (20.0/20 ov). New Zealand win by 22 runs. New Zealand win the 2-match series 2–0.

Cycling
Vuelta a España:
Stage 6 – Xàtiva, 186 km: (1) Borut Božič  4h 40' 50" (2) Tyler Farrar  + 0" (3) Daniele Bennati  + 0"
General classification: (1)  André Greipel  24h 21' 13" (2) Tom Boonen  + 6" (3) Bennati + 9"
Mountain Bike World Championships in Canberra, Australia:
Four-cross men:  Jared Graves   Romain Saladini   Jakub Riha 
Four-cross women:  Caroline Buchanan   Jill Kintner   Melissa Buhl

Football (soccer)
Women's Euro in Finland:
Quarter-finals:
 2–1 
 1–3

Tennis
US Open, day 5: (seeding in parentheses)
Men's Singles, second round:
Andy Murray  [2] def. Paul Capdeville  6–2, 3–6, 6–0, 6–2
Rafael Nadal  [3] def. Nicolas Kiefer  6–0, 3–6, 6–3, 6–4
Juan Martín del Potro  [6] def. Jürgen Melzer  7–6(6), 6–3, 6–3
Jo-Wilfried Tsonga  [7] def. Jarkko Nieminen  7–5, 6–3, 6–4
Gilles Simon  [9] def. Thomaz Bellucci  6–3, 6–2, 6–4
Women's Singles, third round:
Serena Williams  [2] def. María José Martínez Sánchez  6–3, 7–5
Venus Williams  [3] def. Magdaléna Rybáriková  6–2, 7–5
Vera Zvonareva  [7] def. Elena Vesnina  [31] 6–2, 6–4
Francesca Schiavone  [26] def. Victoria Azarenka  [8] 4–6, 6–2, 6–2
Flavia Pennetta  [10] def. Aleksandra Wozniak  6–1, 6–1

Volleyball
European Men's Championship in İzmir and İstanbul, Turkey: (teams in bold advance to the second round)
Pool A in Izmir:
 3–1 
Pool B in Istanbul:
 3–1 
Pool C in Izmir:
 3–0 
 0–3 
Pool D in Istanbul:
 3–0 
 0–3

September 3, 2009 (Thursday)

American football
College football:
NCAA AP Top 25:
(14) Boise State 19, (16) Oregon 8
 The Broncos' win on their famous blue turf is marred by a post-game incident which saw Oregon running back LeGarrette Blount punch Boise State linebacker/defensive end Byron Hout and attempt to go into the stands to confront heckling fans.
NFL news:
 NFL commissioner Roger Goodell rules that Philadelphia Eagles quarterback Michael Vick will be eligible to play in week 3 of the regular season. (ESPN)

Basketball
Americas Championship in San Juan, Puerto Rico: (teams in bold advance to the semifinals and qualify for 2010 World Championship)
Quarter Final Round:
 97–65 
 73–86 
 62–82 
 78–80 
Standings (after 6 games): Brazil 12 points, Argentina, Puerto Rico 11, Dominican Republic 9, Uruguay, Canada 8, Panama 7, Mexico 6.

Cycling
Vuelta a España:
Stage 5 – Tarragona to Vinaròs, 174 km: (1) André Greipel  4h 27' 54" (2) Tom Boonen  + 0" (3) Daniele Bennati  + 0"
General classification: (1)  Greipel 19h 40' 23" (2) Boonen + 6" (3) Fabian Cancellara  + 9"

Football (soccer)
Women's Euro in Finland:
Quarter-finals:
 2–3 
 0–0 (ET) . Netherlands win 5–4 in penalty shootout
News:
English Premier League football club Chelsea F.C. is banned from registering players on transfer during their next two transfer windows by FIFA for inducing Gaël Kakuta to illegally break his contract with French Ligue 1 club RC Lens in 2007. They will be unable to transfer players in until January 2011. 
Chelsea F.C. must pay restitution to RC Lens of €130,000 (£113,000) for Kakuta's breach of contract.
Kakuta himself is suspended from playing at any level by FIFA for four months, and fined €780,000 (£680,000).
Chelsea captain John Terry states the club will appeal the ban and fines.
Following the successful claim by RC Lens, French Ligue 2 club Le Havre AC announces they are considering filing a complaint with FIFA against Manchester United F.C. over their signing of Le Havre academy player Paul Pogba. Pogba's signing has not yet been approved by FIFA.

Snooker
Premier League Snooker – League phase, in Penrith, Cumbria
Neil Robertson  4–2 Judd Trump 
Ronnie O'Sullivan  4–2 Marco Fu 
Standings: Ronnie O'Sullivan, Neil Robertson 2 points; Judd Trump, John Higgins, Stephen Hendry, Marco Fu, Shaun Murphy 0.

Tennis
US Open, day 4: (seeding in parentheses)
Men's Singles, second round:
Novak Djokovic  [4] def. Carsten Ball  6–3, 6–4, 6–4
Andy Roddick  [5] def. Marc Gicquel  6–1, 6–4, 6–4
Nikolay Davydenko  [8] def. Jan Hernych  6–4, 6–1, 6–2
Fernando Verdasco  [10] def. Florent Serra  6–3, 6–0, 6–3
Women's Singles, second round:
Dinara Safina  [1] def. Kristina Barrois  6–7(5), 6–2, 6–3
Melanie Oudin  def. Elena Dementieva  [4] 5–7, 6–4, 6–3
Yaroslava Shvedova  def. Jelena Janković  [5] 6–3, 6–7(4), 7–6(6)
Svetlana Kuznetsova  [6] def. Anastasija Sevastova  6–4, 6–2
Caroline Wozniacki  [9] def. Petra Martić  6–1, 6–0

Volleyball
European Men's Championship in İzmir and İstanbul, Turkey:
Pool A in Izmir:
 3–1 
 3–2 
Pool B in Istanbul:
 1–3 
 3–2 
Pool C in Izmir:
 3–0 
Pool D in Istanbul:
 3–2

September 2, 2009 (Wednesday)

Basketball
Americas Championship in San Juan, Puerto Rico (teams in bold advance to the semifinals and qualify for 2010 World Championship)
Quarter Final Round:
 68–59 
 83–77 
 77–65 
 76–85 
Standings after 5 games: Puerto Rico, Brazil 10 points; Argentina 9; Dominican Republic, Uruguay 7; Canada, Panama 6; Mexico 5.

Cricket
New Zealand in Sri Lanka:
1st T20I in Colombo:
 141/8 (20.0/20 ov); Sri Lanka 138/9 (20.0/20 ov). New Zealand win by 3 runs. New Zealand lead the 2-match series 1–0.

Football (soccer)
Copa Sudamericana First Stage, first leg:
Atlético Paranaense  0–0  Botafogo
US Open Cup Final in Washington, D.C.:
Seattle Sounders FC 2–1 D.C. United

Tennis
US Open, day 3: (seeding in parentheses)
Men's Singles, first round:
Rafael Nadal  [3] def. Richard Gasquet  6–2, 6–2, 6–3
Juan Martín del Potro  [6] def. Juan Mónaco  6–3, 6–3, 6–1
Gilles Simon  [9] def. Daniel Gimeno Traver  6–4, 7–6(3), 6–3
Men's Singles, second round:
Roger Federer  [1] def. Simon Greul  6–3, 7–5, 7–5
Women's Singles, second round:
Serena Williams  [2] def. Melinda Czink  6–1, 6–1
Venus Williams  [3] def. Bethanie Mattek-Sands  6–4, 6–2
Vera Zvonareva  [7] def. Anna Chakvetadze  3–6, 6–1, 6–1
Victoria Azarenka  [8] def. Barbora Záhlavová-Strýcová  6–2, 6–1
Flavia Pennetta  [10] def. Sania Mirza  6–0 6–0

September 1, 2009 (Tuesday)

Basketball
Americas Championship in San Juan, Puerto Rico:
Quarter Final Round:
 74–80 
 51–67 
 61–92 
 79–51 
Standings (4 games): Puerto Rico, Brazil 8 points, Argentina 7, Dominican Republic, Uruguay 6, Canada 5, Panama, Mexico 4.

Cycling
Vuelta a España:
Stage 4 – Venlo (Netherlands) to Liège (Belgium), 224 km: (1) André Greipel  5h 43' 05" (2) Wouter Weylandt  + 0" (3) Bert Grabsch  + 0"
General Classification: (1)  Fabian Cancellara  15h 12' 38" (2) Tom Boonen  + 9" (3) Bert Grabsch  + 11"

Cricket
Australia in England:
2nd Twenty20 in Manchester:
Match abandoned without a ball bowled. 2-match series drawn 0–0.
Afghanistan in Netherlands:
2nd ODI in Amstelveen:
 231/7 (50 ov);  232/4 (46.4 ov, Mohammad Shehzad 110). Afghanistan win by 6 wickets. 2-match series drawn 1–1.

Tennis
US Open, day 2: (seeding in parentheses)
Men's Singles, first round:
Andy Murray  [2] def. Ernests Gulbis  7–5, 6–3, 7–5
Novak Djokovic  [4] def. Ivan Ljubičić  6–3, 6–1, 6–3
Jo-Wilfried Tsonga  [7] def. Chase Buchanan  6–0, 6–2, 6–1
Fernando Verdasco  [10] def. Benjamin Becker  7–5 6–4 7–5
Women's Singles, first round:
Dinara Safina  [1] def. Olivia Rogowska  6–7(5) 6–2 6–4
Elena Dementieva  [4] def. Camille Pin  6–1, 6–2
Jelena Janković  [5] def. Roberta Vinci  6–2, 6–3
Svetlana Kuznetsova  [6] def. Julia Görges  6–3, 6–2
Caroline Wozniacki  [9] def. Galina Voskoboeva  6–4, 6–0

References

9